

199001–199100 

|-bgcolor=#fefefe
| 199001 ||  || — || November 25, 2005 || Kitt Peak || Spacewatch || — || align=right data-sort-value="0.89" | 890 m || 
|-id=002 bgcolor=#fefefe
| 199002 ||  || — || November 28, 2005 || Junk Bond || D. Healy || — || align=right | 1.2 km || 
|-id=003 bgcolor=#FFC2E0
| 199003 ||  || — || November 29, 2005 || Socorro || LINEAR || ATE +1kmPHA || align=right data-sort-value="0.84" | 840 m || 
|-id=004 bgcolor=#fefefe
| 199004 ||  || — || November 22, 2005 || Kitt Peak || Spacewatch || — || align=right | 1.0 km || 
|-id=005 bgcolor=#fefefe
| 199005 ||  || — || November 22, 2005 || Kitt Peak || Spacewatch || CLA || align=right | 2.5 km || 
|-id=006 bgcolor=#fefefe
| 199006 ||  || — || November 25, 2005 || Mount Lemmon || Mount Lemmon Survey || FLO || align=right data-sort-value="0.79" | 790 m || 
|-id=007 bgcolor=#fefefe
| 199007 ||  || — || November 26, 2005 || Mount Lemmon || Mount Lemmon Survey || MAS || align=right | 1.00 km || 
|-id=008 bgcolor=#fefefe
| 199008 ||  || — || November 25, 2005 || Kitt Peak || Spacewatch || FLO || align=right data-sort-value="0.98" | 980 m || 
|-id=009 bgcolor=#fefefe
| 199009 ||  || — || November 26, 2005 || Mount Lemmon || Mount Lemmon Survey || — || align=right data-sort-value="0.93" | 930 m || 
|-id=010 bgcolor=#fefefe
| 199010 ||  || — || November 25, 2005 || Mount Lemmon || Mount Lemmon Survey || — || align=right | 1.1 km || 
|-id=011 bgcolor=#fefefe
| 199011 ||  || — || November 28, 2005 || Mount Lemmon || Mount Lemmon Survey || MAS || align=right | 1.1 km || 
|-id=012 bgcolor=#fefefe
| 199012 ||  || — || November 28, 2005 || Mount Lemmon || Mount Lemmon Survey || — || align=right | 1.1 km || 
|-id=013 bgcolor=#fefefe
| 199013 ||  || — || November 25, 2005 || Mount Lemmon || Mount Lemmon Survey || FLO || align=right | 1.1 km || 
|-id=014 bgcolor=#fefefe
| 199014 ||  || — || November 26, 2005 || Catalina || CSS || — || align=right | 1.1 km || 
|-id=015 bgcolor=#fefefe
| 199015 ||  || — || November 28, 2005 || Catalina || CSS || — || align=right | 2.8 km || 
|-id=016 bgcolor=#fefefe
| 199016 ||  || — || November 25, 2005 || Mount Lemmon || Mount Lemmon Survey || FLO || align=right | 1.1 km || 
|-id=017 bgcolor=#fefefe
| 199017 ||  || — || November 25, 2005 || Mount Lemmon || Mount Lemmon Survey || — || align=right | 1.7 km || 
|-id=018 bgcolor=#fefefe
| 199018 ||  || — || November 26, 2005 || Kitt Peak || Spacewatch || — || align=right data-sort-value="0.69" | 690 m || 
|-id=019 bgcolor=#fefefe
| 199019 ||  || — || November 26, 2005 || Kitt Peak || Spacewatch || — || align=right | 1.3 km || 
|-id=020 bgcolor=#fefefe
| 199020 ||  || — || November 26, 2005 || Kitt Peak || Spacewatch || NYS || align=right | 1.0 km || 
|-id=021 bgcolor=#fefefe
| 199021 ||  || — || November 26, 2005 || Kitt Peak || Spacewatch || V || align=right | 1.0 km || 
|-id=022 bgcolor=#fefefe
| 199022 ||  || — || November 28, 2005 || Mount Lemmon || Mount Lemmon Survey || V || align=right data-sort-value="0.85" | 850 m || 
|-id=023 bgcolor=#fefefe
| 199023 ||  || — || November 29, 2005 || Socorro || LINEAR || — || align=right data-sort-value="0.94" | 940 m || 
|-id=024 bgcolor=#fefefe
| 199024 ||  || — || November 28, 2005 || Catalina || CSS || NYS || align=right | 2.2 km || 
|-id=025 bgcolor=#fefefe
| 199025 ||  || — || November 28, 2005 || Catalina || CSS || FLO || align=right data-sort-value="0.72" | 720 m || 
|-id=026 bgcolor=#fefefe
| 199026 ||  || — || November 29, 2005 || Catalina || CSS || — || align=right | 1.1 km || 
|-id=027 bgcolor=#E9E9E9
| 199027 ||  || — || November 30, 2005 || Socorro || LINEAR || MIT || align=right | 4.0 km || 
|-id=028 bgcolor=#fefefe
| 199028 ||  || — || November 28, 2005 || Socorro || LINEAR || FLO || align=right data-sort-value="0.98" | 980 m || 
|-id=029 bgcolor=#fefefe
| 199029 ||  || — || November 25, 2005 || Mount Lemmon || Mount Lemmon Survey || — || align=right | 1.2 km || 
|-id=030 bgcolor=#fefefe
| 199030 ||  || — || November 25, 2005 || Mount Lemmon || Mount Lemmon Survey || — || align=right data-sort-value="0.79" | 790 m || 
|-id=031 bgcolor=#fefefe
| 199031 ||  || — || November 26, 2005 || Mount Lemmon || Mount Lemmon Survey || — || align=right data-sort-value="0.60" | 600 m || 
|-id=032 bgcolor=#fefefe
| 199032 ||  || — || November 26, 2005 || Mount Lemmon || Mount Lemmon Survey || — || align=right | 1.1 km || 
|-id=033 bgcolor=#fefefe
| 199033 ||  || — || November 26, 2005 || Mount Lemmon || Mount Lemmon Survey || — || align=right | 1.2 km || 
|-id=034 bgcolor=#E9E9E9
| 199034 ||  || — || November 28, 2005 || Mount Lemmon || Mount Lemmon Survey || — || align=right | 4.5 km || 
|-id=035 bgcolor=#fefefe
| 199035 ||  || — || November 30, 2005 || Kitt Peak || Spacewatch || — || align=right | 2.1 km || 
|-id=036 bgcolor=#fefefe
| 199036 ||  || — || November 28, 2005 || Kitt Peak || Spacewatch || — || align=right | 1.3 km || 
|-id=037 bgcolor=#fefefe
| 199037 ||  || — || November 28, 2005 || Kitt Peak || Spacewatch || V || align=right | 1.1 km || 
|-id=038 bgcolor=#fefefe
| 199038 ||  || — || November 28, 2005 || Socorro || LINEAR || — || align=right | 1.0 km || 
|-id=039 bgcolor=#fefefe
| 199039 ||  || — || November 29, 2005 || Kitt Peak || Spacewatch || — || align=right | 1.4 km || 
|-id=040 bgcolor=#fefefe
| 199040 ||  || — || November 29, 2005 || Kitt Peak || Spacewatch || FLO || align=right data-sort-value="0.81" | 810 m || 
|-id=041 bgcolor=#fefefe
| 199041 ||  || — || November 30, 2005 || Kitt Peak || Spacewatch || — || align=right data-sort-value="0.94" | 940 m || 
|-id=042 bgcolor=#fefefe
| 199042 ||  || — || November 22, 2005 || Kitt Peak || Spacewatch || — || align=right | 1.0 km || 
|-id=043 bgcolor=#fefefe
| 199043 ||  || — || November 25, 2005 || Catalina || CSS || FLO || align=right data-sort-value="0.89" | 890 m || 
|-id=044 bgcolor=#fefefe
| 199044 ||  || — || November 25, 2005 || Mount Lemmon || Mount Lemmon Survey || — || align=right | 1.2 km || 
|-id=045 bgcolor=#fefefe
| 199045 ||  || — || November 26, 2005 || Mount Lemmon || Mount Lemmon Survey || — || align=right data-sort-value="0.96" | 960 m || 
|-id=046 bgcolor=#fefefe
| 199046 ||  || — || November 29, 2005 || Socorro || LINEAR || FLO || align=right | 1.1 km || 
|-id=047 bgcolor=#fefefe
| 199047 ||  || — || November 30, 2005 || Kitt Peak || Spacewatch || NYS || align=right data-sort-value="0.76" | 760 m || 
|-id=048 bgcolor=#fefefe
| 199048 ||  || — || November 30, 2005 || Kitt Peak || Spacewatch || — || align=right | 1.6 km || 
|-id=049 bgcolor=#E9E9E9
| 199049 ||  || — || November 30, 2005 || Kitt Peak || Spacewatch || — || align=right | 3.5 km || 
|-id=050 bgcolor=#fefefe
| 199050 ||  || — || November 30, 2005 || Socorro || LINEAR || — || align=right | 1.1 km || 
|-id=051 bgcolor=#E9E9E9
| 199051 ||  || — || November 30, 2005 || Kitt Peak || Spacewatch || — || align=right | 1.2 km || 
|-id=052 bgcolor=#E9E9E9
| 199052 ||  || — || November 30, 2005 || Kitt Peak || Spacewatch || — || align=right | 3.5 km || 
|-id=053 bgcolor=#fefefe
| 199053 ||  || — || November 30, 2005 || Socorro || LINEAR || — || align=right data-sort-value="0.87" | 870 m || 
|-id=054 bgcolor=#fefefe
| 199054 ||  || — || November 30, 2005 || Socorro || LINEAR || — || align=right data-sort-value="0.92" | 920 m || 
|-id=055 bgcolor=#fefefe
| 199055 ||  || — || November 25, 2005 || Mount Lemmon || Mount Lemmon Survey || V || align=right data-sort-value="0.68" | 680 m || 
|-id=056 bgcolor=#fefefe
| 199056 ||  || — || November 25, 2005 || Mount Lemmon || Mount Lemmon Survey || — || align=right data-sort-value="0.89" | 890 m || 
|-id=057 bgcolor=#fefefe
| 199057 ||  || — || December 4, 2005 || Socorro || LINEAR || — || align=right | 1.1 km || 
|-id=058 bgcolor=#fefefe
| 199058 ||  || — || December 5, 2005 || Goodricke-Pigott || Goodricke-Pigott Obs. || — || align=right | 1.4 km || 
|-id=059 bgcolor=#fefefe
| 199059 ||  || — || December 2, 2005 || Mount Lemmon || Mount Lemmon Survey || — || align=right | 1.0 km || 
|-id=060 bgcolor=#fefefe
| 199060 ||  || — || December 4, 2005 || Socorro || LINEAR || — || align=right | 1.5 km || 
|-id=061 bgcolor=#fefefe
| 199061 ||  || — || December 1, 2005 || Kitt Peak || Spacewatch || — || align=right | 1.1 km || 
|-id=062 bgcolor=#fefefe
| 199062 ||  || — || December 1, 2005 || Kitt Peak || Spacewatch || V || align=right data-sort-value="0.92" | 920 m || 
|-id=063 bgcolor=#fefefe
| 199063 ||  || — || December 1, 2005 || Kitt Peak || Spacewatch || — || align=right | 1.2 km || 
|-id=064 bgcolor=#fefefe
| 199064 ||  || — || December 1, 2005 || Kitt Peak || Spacewatch || FLO || align=right data-sort-value="0.74" | 740 m || 
|-id=065 bgcolor=#fefefe
| 199065 ||  || — || December 2, 2005 || Kitt Peak || Spacewatch || NYS || align=right data-sort-value="0.87" | 870 m || 
|-id=066 bgcolor=#fefefe
| 199066 ||  || — || December 2, 2005 || Socorro || LINEAR || — || align=right | 1.5 km || 
|-id=067 bgcolor=#fefefe
| 199067 ||  || — || December 4, 2005 || Kitt Peak || Spacewatch || FLO || align=right data-sort-value="0.96" | 960 m || 
|-id=068 bgcolor=#fefefe
| 199068 ||  || — || December 5, 2005 || Mount Lemmon || Mount Lemmon Survey || — || align=right | 1.6 km || 
|-id=069 bgcolor=#fefefe
| 199069 ||  || — || December 7, 2005 || Socorro || LINEAR || — || align=right data-sort-value="0.76" | 760 m || 
|-id=070 bgcolor=#fefefe
| 199070 ||  || — || December 2, 2005 || Kitt Peak || Spacewatch || — || align=right | 1.4 km || 
|-id=071 bgcolor=#fefefe
| 199071 ||  || — || December 2, 2005 || Kitt Peak || Spacewatch || — || align=right | 1.5 km || 
|-id=072 bgcolor=#fefefe
| 199072 ||  || — || December 5, 2005 || Mount Lemmon || Mount Lemmon Survey || — || align=right | 1.1 km || 
|-id=073 bgcolor=#d6d6d6
| 199073 ||  || — || December 1, 2005 || Kitt Peak || Spacewatch || EOS || align=right | 3.1 km || 
|-id=074 bgcolor=#fefefe
| 199074 ||  || — || December 5, 2005 || Mount Lemmon || Mount Lemmon Survey || FLO || align=right | 1.4 km || 
|-id=075 bgcolor=#fefefe
| 199075 ||  || — || December 5, 2005 || Socorro || LINEAR || — || align=right data-sort-value="0.96" | 960 m || 
|-id=076 bgcolor=#fefefe
| 199076 ||  || — || December 7, 2005 || Socorro || LINEAR || — || align=right | 1.4 km || 
|-id=077 bgcolor=#E9E9E9
| 199077 ||  || — || December 5, 2005 || Kitt Peak || Spacewatch || — || align=right | 3.3 km || 
|-id=078 bgcolor=#fefefe
| 199078 ||  || — || December 6, 2005 || Kitt Peak || Spacewatch || — || align=right | 1.1 km || 
|-id=079 bgcolor=#fefefe
| 199079 ||  || — || December 9, 2005 || Socorro || LINEAR || CLA || align=right | 3.3 km || 
|-id=080 bgcolor=#fefefe
| 199080 ||  || — || December 2, 2005 || Mount Lemmon || Mount Lemmon Survey || FLO || align=right data-sort-value="0.85" | 850 m || 
|-id=081 bgcolor=#d6d6d6
| 199081 ||  || — || December 4, 2005 || Kitt Peak || Spacewatch || HYG || align=right | 3.9 km || 
|-id=082 bgcolor=#fefefe
| 199082 ||  || — || December 10, 2005 || Kitt Peak || Spacewatch || — || align=right | 1.1 km || 
|-id=083 bgcolor=#fefefe
| 199083 ||  || — || December 4, 2005 || Catalina || CSS || — || align=right | 1.2 km || 
|-id=084 bgcolor=#d6d6d6
| 199084 ||  || — || December 1, 2005 || Kitt Peak || M. W. Buie || — || align=right | 5.6 km || 
|-id=085 bgcolor=#E9E9E9
| 199085 ||  || — || December 1, 2005 || Kitt Peak || M. W. Buie || — || align=right | 2.8 km || 
|-id=086 bgcolor=#E9E9E9
| 199086 ||  || — || December 5, 2005 || Mount Lemmon || Mount Lemmon Survey || — || align=right | 2.1 km || 
|-id=087 bgcolor=#d6d6d6
| 199087 ||  || — || December 1, 2005 || Kitt Peak || Spacewatch || — || align=right | 3.6 km || 
|-id=088 bgcolor=#fefefe
| 199088 ||  || — || December 4, 2005 || Kitt Peak || Spacewatch || — || align=right data-sort-value="0.64" | 640 m || 
|-id=089 bgcolor=#fefefe
| 199089 ||  || — || December 21, 2005 || Catalina || CSS || FLO || align=right data-sort-value="0.84" | 840 m || 
|-id=090 bgcolor=#fefefe
| 199090 ||  || — || December 22, 2005 || Kitt Peak || Spacewatch || MAS || align=right data-sort-value="0.90" | 900 m || 
|-id=091 bgcolor=#fefefe
| 199091 ||  || — || December 21, 2005 || Kitt Peak || Spacewatch || NYS || align=right data-sort-value="0.79" | 790 m || 
|-id=092 bgcolor=#E9E9E9
| 199092 ||  || — || December 21, 2005 || Kitt Peak || Spacewatch || — || align=right | 2.4 km || 
|-id=093 bgcolor=#fefefe
| 199093 ||  || — || December 23, 2005 || Kitt Peak || Spacewatch || FLO || align=right | 2.2 km || 
|-id=094 bgcolor=#E9E9E9
| 199094 ||  || — || December 24, 2005 || Kitt Peak || Spacewatch || — || align=right | 3.4 km || 
|-id=095 bgcolor=#fefefe
| 199095 ||  || — || December 24, 2005 || Kitt Peak || Spacewatch || — || align=right | 1.00 km || 
|-id=096 bgcolor=#fefefe
| 199096 ||  || — || December 24, 2005 || Kitt Peak || Spacewatch || — || align=right | 1.2 km || 
|-id=097 bgcolor=#fefefe
| 199097 ||  || — || December 22, 2005 || Kitt Peak || Spacewatch || NYS || align=right data-sort-value="0.93" | 930 m || 
|-id=098 bgcolor=#E9E9E9
| 199098 ||  || — || December 22, 2005 || Kitt Peak || Spacewatch || — || align=right | 1.6 km || 
|-id=099 bgcolor=#fefefe
| 199099 ||  || — || December 22, 2005 || Kitt Peak || Spacewatch || — || align=right | 1.5 km || 
|-id=100 bgcolor=#fefefe
| 199100 ||  || — || December 22, 2005 || Kitt Peak || Spacewatch || — || align=right data-sort-value="0.83" | 830 m || 
|}

199101–199200 

|-bgcolor=#fefefe
| 199101 ||  || — || December 22, 2005 || Kitt Peak || Spacewatch || FLO || align=right data-sort-value="0.84" | 840 m || 
|-id=102 bgcolor=#fefefe
| 199102 ||  || — || December 24, 2005 || Kitt Peak || Spacewatch || — || align=right | 1.3 km || 
|-id=103 bgcolor=#fefefe
| 199103 ||  || — || December 25, 2005 || Kitt Peak || Spacewatch || FLO || align=right | 1.2 km || 
|-id=104 bgcolor=#fefefe
| 199104 ||  || — || December 24, 2005 || Kitt Peak || Spacewatch || FLO || align=right data-sort-value="0.81" | 810 m || 
|-id=105 bgcolor=#fefefe
| 199105 ||  || — || December 24, 2005 || Kitt Peak || Spacewatch || V || align=right data-sort-value="0.78" | 780 m || 
|-id=106 bgcolor=#fefefe
| 199106 ||  || — || December 25, 2005 || Kitt Peak || Spacewatch || — || align=right | 1.0 km || 
|-id=107 bgcolor=#fefefe
| 199107 ||  || — || December 25, 2005 || Kitt Peak || Spacewatch || MAS || align=right | 1.1 km || 
|-id=108 bgcolor=#fefefe
| 199108 ||  || — || December 26, 2005 || Kitt Peak || Spacewatch || NYS || align=right | 1.1 km || 
|-id=109 bgcolor=#fefefe
| 199109 ||  || — || December 22, 2005 || Kitt Peak || Spacewatch || NYS || align=right data-sort-value="0.96" | 960 m || 
|-id=110 bgcolor=#fefefe
| 199110 ||  || — || December 22, 2005 || Kitt Peak || Spacewatch || — || align=right | 1.1 km || 
|-id=111 bgcolor=#fefefe
| 199111 ||  || — || December 22, 2005 || Kitt Peak || Spacewatch || — || align=right data-sort-value="0.98" | 980 m || 
|-id=112 bgcolor=#fefefe
| 199112 ||  || — || December 25, 2005 || Kitt Peak || Spacewatch || NYS || align=right | 1.0 km || 
|-id=113 bgcolor=#fefefe
| 199113 ||  || — || December 22, 2005 || Kitt Peak || Spacewatch || NYS || align=right | 1.4 km || 
|-id=114 bgcolor=#d6d6d6
| 199114 ||  || — || December 24, 2005 || Kitt Peak || Spacewatch || — || align=right | 6.3 km || 
|-id=115 bgcolor=#E9E9E9
| 199115 ||  || — || December 23, 2005 || Kitt Peak || Spacewatch || — || align=right | 1.2 km || 
|-id=116 bgcolor=#fefefe
| 199116 ||  || — || December 23, 2005 || Kitt Peak || Spacewatch || NYS || align=right data-sort-value="0.84" | 840 m || 
|-id=117 bgcolor=#E9E9E9
| 199117 ||  || — || December 26, 2005 || Kitt Peak || Spacewatch || — || align=right | 1.5 km || 
|-id=118 bgcolor=#E9E9E9
| 199118 ||  || — || December 24, 2005 || Kitt Peak || Spacewatch || — || align=right | 1.1 km || 
|-id=119 bgcolor=#fefefe
| 199119 ||  || — || December 24, 2005 || Kitt Peak || Spacewatch || — || align=right | 1.1 km || 
|-id=120 bgcolor=#E9E9E9
| 199120 ||  || — || December 24, 2005 || Kitt Peak || Spacewatch || — || align=right | 2.0 km || 
|-id=121 bgcolor=#fefefe
| 199121 ||  || — || December 24, 2005 || Kitt Peak || Spacewatch || NYS || align=right data-sort-value="0.90" | 900 m || 
|-id=122 bgcolor=#fefefe
| 199122 ||  || — || December 24, 2005 || Kitt Peak || Spacewatch || MAS || align=right | 1.0 km || 
|-id=123 bgcolor=#fefefe
| 199123 ||  || — || December 24, 2005 || Kitt Peak || Spacewatch || NYS || align=right data-sort-value="0.85" | 850 m || 
|-id=124 bgcolor=#fefefe
| 199124 ||  || — || December 26, 2005 || Mount Lemmon || Mount Lemmon Survey || — || align=right | 1.2 km || 
|-id=125 bgcolor=#E9E9E9
| 199125 ||  || — || December 27, 2005 || Mount Lemmon || Mount Lemmon Survey || — || align=right | 1.4 km || 
|-id=126 bgcolor=#fefefe
| 199126 ||  || — || December 26, 2005 || Catalina || CSS || — || align=right | 2.4 km || 
|-id=127 bgcolor=#fefefe
| 199127 ||  || — || December 26, 2005 || Catalina || CSS || ERI || align=right | 3.2 km || 
|-id=128 bgcolor=#fefefe
| 199128 ||  || — || December 27, 2005 || Catalina || CSS || — || align=right | 1.2 km || 
|-id=129 bgcolor=#fefefe
| 199129 ||  || — || December 21, 2005 || Kitt Peak || Spacewatch || — || align=right | 2.2 km || 
|-id=130 bgcolor=#E9E9E9
| 199130 ||  || — || December 25, 2005 || Kitt Peak || Spacewatch || — || align=right | 3.3 km || 
|-id=131 bgcolor=#fefefe
| 199131 ||  || — || December 25, 2005 || Kitt Peak || Spacewatch || — || align=right data-sort-value="0.93" | 930 m || 
|-id=132 bgcolor=#fefefe
| 199132 ||  || — || December 26, 2005 || Kitt Peak || Spacewatch || — || align=right | 1.0 km || 
|-id=133 bgcolor=#fefefe
| 199133 ||  || — || December 26, 2005 || Kitt Peak || Spacewatch || — || align=right | 1.1 km || 
|-id=134 bgcolor=#fefefe
| 199134 ||  || — || December 22, 2005 || Kitt Peak || Spacewatch || — || align=right | 1.2 km || 
|-id=135 bgcolor=#fefefe
| 199135 ||  || — || December 25, 2005 || Mount Lemmon || Mount Lemmon Survey || — || align=right data-sort-value="0.87" | 870 m || 
|-id=136 bgcolor=#E9E9E9
| 199136 ||  || — || December 25, 2005 || Kitt Peak || Spacewatch || — || align=right data-sort-value="0.94" | 940 m || 
|-id=137 bgcolor=#fefefe
| 199137 ||  || — || December 25, 2005 || Kitt Peak || Spacewatch || — || align=right | 1.9 km || 
|-id=138 bgcolor=#fefefe
| 199138 ||  || — || December 25, 2005 || Mount Lemmon || Mount Lemmon Survey || — || align=right data-sort-value="0.98" | 980 m || 
|-id=139 bgcolor=#fefefe
| 199139 ||  || — || December 25, 2005 || Kitt Peak || Spacewatch || V || align=right data-sort-value="0.87" | 870 m || 
|-id=140 bgcolor=#fefefe
| 199140 ||  || — || December 25, 2005 || Kitt Peak || Spacewatch || — || align=right | 1.4 km || 
|-id=141 bgcolor=#fefefe
| 199141 ||  || — || December 28, 2005 || Mount Lemmon || Mount Lemmon Survey || — || align=right | 1.1 km || 
|-id=142 bgcolor=#fefefe
| 199142 ||  || — || December 26, 2005 || Kitt Peak || Spacewatch || NYS || align=right | 1.1 km || 
|-id=143 bgcolor=#fefefe
| 199143 ||  || — || December 26, 2005 || Kitt Peak || Spacewatch || V || align=right data-sort-value="0.86" | 860 m || 
|-id=144 bgcolor=#fefefe
| 199144 ||  || — || December 28, 2005 || Palomar || NEAT || — || align=right | 1.1 km || 
|-id=145 bgcolor=#FFC2E0
| 199145 ||  || — || December 30, 2005 || Kitt Peak || Spacewatch || APO +1kmPHA || align=right data-sort-value="0.81" | 810 m || 
|-id=146 bgcolor=#fefefe
| 199146 ||  || — || December 26, 2005 || Kitt Peak || Spacewatch || — || align=right | 1.0 km || 
|-id=147 bgcolor=#fefefe
| 199147 ||  || — || December 26, 2005 || Kitt Peak || Spacewatch || — || align=right | 1.1 km || 
|-id=148 bgcolor=#fefefe
| 199148 ||  || — || December 28, 2005 || Mount Lemmon || Mount Lemmon Survey || V || align=right data-sort-value="0.98" | 980 m || 
|-id=149 bgcolor=#fefefe
| 199149 ||  || — || December 29, 2005 || Socorro || LINEAR || — || align=right | 1.0 km || 
|-id=150 bgcolor=#fefefe
| 199150 ||  || — || December 25, 2005 || Kitt Peak || Spacewatch || — || align=right | 1.1 km || 
|-id=151 bgcolor=#fefefe
| 199151 ||  || — || December 29, 2005 || Socorro || LINEAR || — || align=right | 1.0 km || 
|-id=152 bgcolor=#fefefe
| 199152 ||  || — || December 26, 2005 || Mount Lemmon || Mount Lemmon Survey || — || align=right data-sort-value="0.87" | 870 m || 
|-id=153 bgcolor=#fefefe
| 199153 ||  || — || December 27, 2005 || Kitt Peak || Spacewatch || — || align=right | 1.00 km || 
|-id=154 bgcolor=#fefefe
| 199154 ||  || — || December 29, 2005 || Catalina || CSS || — || align=right | 1.3 km || 
|-id=155 bgcolor=#E9E9E9
| 199155 ||  || — || December 27, 2005 || Kitt Peak || Spacewatch || — || align=right | 1.8 km || 
|-id=156 bgcolor=#fefefe
| 199156 ||  || — || December 31, 2005 || Kitt Peak || Spacewatch || — || align=right | 1.1 km || 
|-id=157 bgcolor=#E9E9E9
| 199157 ||  || — || December 31, 2005 || Kitt Peak || Spacewatch || — || align=right | 1.2 km || 
|-id=158 bgcolor=#fefefe
| 199158 ||  || — || December 30, 2005 || Socorro || LINEAR || NYS || align=right | 1.8 km || 
|-id=159 bgcolor=#d6d6d6
| 199159 ||  || — || December 22, 2005 || Catalina || CSS || AEG || align=right | 5.8 km || 
|-id=160 bgcolor=#E9E9E9
| 199160 ||  || — || December 28, 2005 || Catalina || CSS || — || align=right | 1.7 km || 
|-id=161 bgcolor=#fefefe
| 199161 ||  || — || December 22, 2005 || Kitt Peak || Spacewatch || — || align=right data-sort-value="0.90" | 900 m || 
|-id=162 bgcolor=#E9E9E9
| 199162 ||  || — || December 22, 2005 || Kitt Peak || Spacewatch || — || align=right | 1.8 km || 
|-id=163 bgcolor=#fefefe
| 199163 ||  || — || December 27, 2005 || Kitt Peak || Spacewatch || — || align=right | 1.2 km || 
|-id=164 bgcolor=#fefefe
| 199164 ||  || — || December 27, 2005 || Kitt Peak || Spacewatch || — || align=right | 1.3 km || 
|-id=165 bgcolor=#fefefe
| 199165 ||  || — || December 30, 2005 || 7300 Observatory || W. K. Y. Yeung || — || align=right | 1.1 km || 
|-id=166 bgcolor=#fefefe
| 199166 ||  || — || December 21, 2005 || Catalina || CSS || — || align=right | 1.3 km || 
|-id=167 bgcolor=#E9E9E9
| 199167 ||  || — || December 30, 2005 || 7300 Observatory || W. K. Y. Yeung || — || align=right | 1.8 km || 
|-id=168 bgcolor=#fefefe
| 199168 ||  || — || December 27, 2005 || Mount Lemmon || Mount Lemmon Survey || NYS || align=right data-sort-value="0.85" | 850 m || 
|-id=169 bgcolor=#E9E9E9
| 199169 ||  || — || December 22, 2005 || Kitt Peak || Spacewatch || — || align=right | 2.1 km || 
|-id=170 bgcolor=#d6d6d6
| 199170 ||  || — || December 25, 2005 || Kitt Peak || Spacewatch || — || align=right | 4.6 km || 
|-id=171 bgcolor=#fefefe
| 199171 ||  || — || December 25, 2005 || Mount Lemmon || Mount Lemmon Survey || MAS || align=right | 1.2 km || 
|-id=172 bgcolor=#fefefe
| 199172 ||  || — || December 25, 2005 || Mount Lemmon || Mount Lemmon Survey || NYS || align=right data-sort-value="0.95" | 950 m || 
|-id=173 bgcolor=#fefefe
| 199173 ||  || — || December 28, 2005 || Catalina || CSS || — || align=right | 1.2 km || 
|-id=174 bgcolor=#fefefe
| 199174 ||  || — || December 29, 2005 || Socorro || LINEAR || — || align=right | 1.2 km || 
|-id=175 bgcolor=#fefefe
| 199175 ||  || — || December 29, 2005 || Palomar || NEAT || V || align=right | 1.1 km || 
|-id=176 bgcolor=#fefefe
| 199176 ||  || — || December 29, 2005 || Kitt Peak || Spacewatch || FLO || align=right data-sort-value="0.92" | 920 m || 
|-id=177 bgcolor=#E9E9E9
| 199177 ||  || — || December 30, 2005 || Socorro || LINEAR || — || align=right | 2.2 km || 
|-id=178 bgcolor=#fefefe
| 199178 ||  || — || December 22, 2005 || Catalina || CSS || — || align=right | 1.3 km || 
|-id=179 bgcolor=#fefefe
| 199179 ||  || — || December 25, 2005 || Mount Lemmon || Mount Lemmon Survey || — || align=right | 1.1 km || 
|-id=180 bgcolor=#E9E9E9
| 199180 ||  || — || December 25, 2005 || Kitt Peak || Spacewatch || — || align=right | 1.5 km || 
|-id=181 bgcolor=#fefefe
| 199181 ||  || — || December 28, 2005 || Mount Lemmon || Mount Lemmon Survey || NYS || align=right | 1.1 km || 
|-id=182 bgcolor=#E9E9E9
| 199182 ||  || — || December 30, 2005 || Kitt Peak || Spacewatch || — || align=right | 1.1 km || 
|-id=183 bgcolor=#fefefe
| 199183 ||  || — || December 30, 2005 || Kitt Peak || Spacewatch || — || align=right data-sort-value="0.85" | 850 m || 
|-id=184 bgcolor=#fefefe
| 199184 ||  || — || December 25, 2005 || Kitt Peak || Spacewatch || — || align=right | 1.3 km || 
|-id=185 bgcolor=#E9E9E9
| 199185 ||  || — || December 25, 2005 || Kitt Peak || Spacewatch || — || align=right | 1.2 km || 
|-id=186 bgcolor=#E9E9E9
| 199186 ||  || — || December 24, 2005 || Kitt Peak || Spacewatch || — || align=right | 4.0 km || 
|-id=187 bgcolor=#E9E9E9
| 199187 ||  || — || December 25, 2005 || Mount Lemmon || Mount Lemmon Survey || — || align=right | 1.9 km || 
|-id=188 bgcolor=#d6d6d6
| 199188 ||  || — || December 26, 2005 || Mount Lemmon || Mount Lemmon Survey || — || align=right | 5.4 km || 
|-id=189 bgcolor=#fefefe
| 199189 ||  || — || December 27, 2005 || Mount Lemmon || Mount Lemmon Survey || — || align=right | 1.2 km || 
|-id=190 bgcolor=#fefefe
| 199190 ||  || — || December 30, 2005 || Kitt Peak || Spacewatch || — || align=right data-sort-value="0.91" | 910 m || 
|-id=191 bgcolor=#fefefe
| 199191 ||  || — || December 26, 2005 || Mount Lemmon || Mount Lemmon Survey || NYS || align=right data-sort-value="0.92" | 920 m || 
|-id=192 bgcolor=#E9E9E9
| 199192 ||  || — || December 30, 2005 || Mount Lemmon || Mount Lemmon Survey || — || align=right | 4.3 km || 
|-id=193 bgcolor=#fefefe
| 199193 || 2006 AM || — || January 3, 2006 || RAS || A. Lowe || — || align=right | 1.8 km || 
|-id=194 bgcolor=#fefefe
| 199194 Calcatreppola || 2006 AO ||  || January 3, 2006 || Gnosca || S. Sposetti || FLO || align=right data-sort-value="0.86" | 860 m || 
|-id=195 bgcolor=#E9E9E9
| 199195 ||  || — || January 2, 2006 || Mount Lemmon || Mount Lemmon Survey || — || align=right | 1.3 km || 
|-id=196 bgcolor=#E9E9E9
| 199196 ||  || — || January 4, 2006 || Catalina || CSS || BRU || align=right | 5.1 km || 
|-id=197 bgcolor=#fefefe
| 199197 ||  || — || January 5, 2006 || Kitami || K. Endate || — || align=right | 1.3 km || 
|-id=198 bgcolor=#fefefe
| 199198 ||  || — || January 2, 2006 || Catalina || CSS || — || align=right data-sort-value="0.74" | 740 m || 
|-id=199 bgcolor=#E9E9E9
| 199199 ||  || — || January 2, 2006 || Catalina || CSS || — || align=right | 5.3 km || 
|-id=200 bgcolor=#E9E9E9
| 199200 ||  || — || January 2, 2006 || Socorro || LINEAR || — || align=right | 3.4 km || 
|}

199201–199300 

|-bgcolor=#fefefe
| 199201 ||  || — || January 4, 2006 || Catalina || CSS || — || align=right | 1.1 km || 
|-id=202 bgcolor=#fefefe
| 199202 ||  || — || January 4, 2006 || Mount Lemmon || Mount Lemmon Survey || — || align=right data-sort-value="0.99" | 990 m || 
|-id=203 bgcolor=#fefefe
| 199203 ||  || — || January 5, 2006 || Socorro || LINEAR || — || align=right | 1.4 km || 
|-id=204 bgcolor=#d6d6d6
| 199204 ||  || — || January 5, 2006 || Kitt Peak || Spacewatch || — || align=right | 4.8 km || 
|-id=205 bgcolor=#E9E9E9
| 199205 ||  || — || January 5, 2006 || Kitt Peak || Spacewatch || HEN || align=right | 1.3 km || 
|-id=206 bgcolor=#E9E9E9
| 199206 ||  || — || January 4, 2006 || Mount Lemmon || Mount Lemmon Survey || — || align=right | 2.0 km || 
|-id=207 bgcolor=#fefefe
| 199207 ||  || — || January 5, 2006 || Catalina || CSS || V || align=right | 1.1 km || 
|-id=208 bgcolor=#fefefe
| 199208 ||  || — || January 5, 2006 || Catalina || CSS || FLO || align=right data-sort-value="0.74" | 740 m || 
|-id=209 bgcolor=#fefefe
| 199209 ||  || — || January 5, 2006 || Catalina || CSS || V || align=right | 1.3 km || 
|-id=210 bgcolor=#E9E9E9
| 199210 ||  || — || January 5, 2006 || Catalina || CSS || — || align=right | 3.4 km || 
|-id=211 bgcolor=#fefefe
| 199211 ||  || — || January 5, 2006 || Catalina || CSS || V || align=right data-sort-value="0.87" | 870 m || 
|-id=212 bgcolor=#fefefe
| 199212 ||  || — || January 5, 2006 || Catalina || CSS || — || align=right | 1.2 km || 
|-id=213 bgcolor=#fefefe
| 199213 ||  || — || January 5, 2006 || Catalina || CSS || — || align=right | 1.9 km || 
|-id=214 bgcolor=#E9E9E9
| 199214 ||  || — || January 5, 2006 || Mount Lemmon || Mount Lemmon Survey || — || align=right | 2.1 km || 
|-id=215 bgcolor=#fefefe
| 199215 ||  || — || January 6, 2006 || Anderson Mesa || LONEOS || NYS || align=right | 1.0 km || 
|-id=216 bgcolor=#E9E9E9
| 199216 ||  || — || January 6, 2006 || Mount Lemmon || Mount Lemmon Survey || — || align=right | 3.6 km || 
|-id=217 bgcolor=#fefefe
| 199217 ||  || — || January 4, 2006 || Catalina || CSS || — || align=right | 3.7 km || 
|-id=218 bgcolor=#fefefe
| 199218 ||  || — || January 5, 2006 || Anderson Mesa || LONEOS || — || align=right | 1.5 km || 
|-id=219 bgcolor=#E9E9E9
| 199219 ||  || — || January 4, 2006 || Kitt Peak || Spacewatch || — || align=right | 1.2 km || 
|-id=220 bgcolor=#E9E9E9
| 199220 ||  || — || January 7, 2006 || Kitt Peak || Spacewatch || — || align=right | 3.5 km || 
|-id=221 bgcolor=#fefefe
| 199221 ||  || — || January 6, 2006 || Kitt Peak || Spacewatch || — || align=right data-sort-value="0.98" | 980 m || 
|-id=222 bgcolor=#fefefe
| 199222 ||  || — || January 6, 2006 || Kitt Peak || Spacewatch || NYS || align=right data-sort-value="0.72" | 720 m || 
|-id=223 bgcolor=#d6d6d6
| 199223 ||  || — || January 6, 2006 || Mount Lemmon || Mount Lemmon Survey || — || align=right | 4.2 km || 
|-id=224 bgcolor=#E9E9E9
| 199224 ||  || — || January 2, 2006 || Catalina || CSS || MAR || align=right | 1.9 km || 
|-id=225 bgcolor=#fefefe
| 199225 ||  || — || January 6, 2006 || Catalina || CSS || V || align=right | 1.0 km || 
|-id=226 bgcolor=#d6d6d6
| 199226 ||  || — || January 8, 2006 || Mount Lemmon || Mount Lemmon Survey || BRA || align=right | 2.7 km || 
|-id=227 bgcolor=#fefefe
| 199227 ||  || — || January 5, 2006 || Kitt Peak || Spacewatch || — || align=right data-sort-value="0.99" | 990 m || 
|-id=228 bgcolor=#fefefe
| 199228 ||  || — || January 5, 2006 || Anderson Mesa || LONEOS || — || align=right | 1.1 km || 
|-id=229 bgcolor=#E9E9E9
| 199229 ||  || — || January 4, 2006 || Mount Lemmon || Mount Lemmon Survey || — || align=right | 1.9 km || 
|-id=230 bgcolor=#fefefe
| 199230 ||  || — || January 8, 2006 || Kitt Peak || Spacewatch || FLO || align=right data-sort-value="0.94" | 940 m || 
|-id=231 bgcolor=#E9E9E9
| 199231 ||  || — || January 8, 2006 || Mount Lemmon || Mount Lemmon Survey || — || align=right | 2.1 km || 
|-id=232 bgcolor=#fefefe
| 199232 ||  || — || January 5, 2006 || Mount Lemmon || Mount Lemmon Survey || MAS || align=right | 1.0 km || 
|-id=233 bgcolor=#fefefe
| 199233 ||  || — || January 5, 2006 || Mount Lemmon || Mount Lemmon Survey || — || align=right | 1.1 km || 
|-id=234 bgcolor=#fefefe
| 199234 ||  || — || January 6, 2006 || Kitt Peak || Spacewatch || — || align=right data-sort-value="0.89" | 890 m || 
|-id=235 bgcolor=#E9E9E9
| 199235 ||  || — || January 6, 2006 || Kitt Peak || Spacewatch || RAF || align=right | 1.4 km || 
|-id=236 bgcolor=#fefefe
| 199236 ||  || — || January 7, 2006 || Mount Lemmon || Mount Lemmon Survey || — || align=right | 1.3 km || 
|-id=237 bgcolor=#fefefe
| 199237 ||  || — || January 5, 2006 || Anderson Mesa || LONEOS || ERI || align=right | 3.1 km || 
|-id=238 bgcolor=#E9E9E9
| 199238 ||  || — || January 6, 2006 || Kitt Peak || Spacewatch || NEM || align=right | 3.4 km || 
|-id=239 bgcolor=#fefefe
| 199239 ||  || — || January 6, 2006 || Mount Lemmon || Mount Lemmon Survey || — || align=right data-sort-value="0.98" | 980 m || 
|-id=240 bgcolor=#fefefe
| 199240 ||  || — || January 6, 2006 || Anderson Mesa || LONEOS || MAS || align=right | 1.1 km || 
|-id=241 bgcolor=#E9E9E9
| 199241 ||  || — || January 6, 2006 || Socorro || LINEAR || — || align=right | 2.5 km || 
|-id=242 bgcolor=#fefefe
| 199242 ||  || — || January 6, 2006 || Catalina || CSS || CIM || align=right | 3.7 km || 
|-id=243 bgcolor=#fefefe
| 199243 ||  || — || January 6, 2006 || Kitt Peak || Spacewatch || MAS || align=right | 1.1 km || 
|-id=244 bgcolor=#fefefe
| 199244 ||  || — || January 7, 2006 || Kitt Peak || Spacewatch || — || align=right data-sort-value="0.98" | 980 m || 
|-id=245 bgcolor=#E9E9E9
| 199245 ||  || — || January 7, 2006 || Mount Lemmon || Mount Lemmon Survey || — || align=right | 1.2 km || 
|-id=246 bgcolor=#E9E9E9
| 199246 ||  || — || January 5, 2006 || Catalina || CSS || — || align=right | 4.1 km || 
|-id=247 bgcolor=#d6d6d6
| 199247 ||  || — || January 5, 2006 || Mount Lemmon || Mount Lemmon Survey || THM || align=right | 3.5 km || 
|-id=248 bgcolor=#E9E9E9
| 199248 ||  || — || January 8, 2006 || Mount Lemmon || Mount Lemmon Survey || — || align=right | 4.5 km || 
|-id=249 bgcolor=#d6d6d6
| 199249 ||  || — || January 5, 2006 || Mount Lemmon || Mount Lemmon Survey || — || align=right | 6.0 km || 
|-id=250 bgcolor=#fefefe
| 199250 ||  || — || January 8, 2006 || Mount Lemmon || Mount Lemmon Survey || NYS || align=right data-sort-value="0.83" | 830 m || 
|-id=251 bgcolor=#fefefe
| 199251 || 2006 BZ || — || January 18, 2006 || Palomar || NEAT || — || align=right | 2.0 km || 
|-id=252 bgcolor=#fefefe
| 199252 ||  || — || January 20, 2006 || Kitt Peak || Spacewatch || V || align=right data-sort-value="0.81" | 810 m || 
|-id=253 bgcolor=#fefefe
| 199253 ||  || — || January 20, 2006 || Kitt Peak || Spacewatch || — || align=right | 2.8 km || 
|-id=254 bgcolor=#E9E9E9
| 199254 ||  || — || January 20, 2006 || Catalina || CSS || — || align=right | 4.1 km || 
|-id=255 bgcolor=#d6d6d6
| 199255 ||  || — || January 21, 2006 || Kitt Peak || Spacewatch || — || align=right | 3.0 km || 
|-id=256 bgcolor=#d6d6d6
| 199256 ||  || — || January 21, 2006 || Mount Lemmon || Mount Lemmon Survey || K-2 || align=right | 2.1 km || 
|-id=257 bgcolor=#E9E9E9
| 199257 ||  || — || January 20, 2006 || Kitt Peak || Spacewatch || — || align=right | 2.1 km || 
|-id=258 bgcolor=#E9E9E9
| 199258 ||  || — || January 20, 2006 || Kitt Peak || Spacewatch || MAR || align=right | 1.9 km || 
|-id=259 bgcolor=#E9E9E9
| 199259 ||  || — || January 21, 2006 || Mount Lemmon || Mount Lemmon Survey || — || align=right | 1.2 km || 
|-id=260 bgcolor=#fefefe
| 199260 ||  || — || January 21, 2006 || Anderson Mesa || LONEOS || FLO || align=right data-sort-value="0.89" | 890 m || 
|-id=261 bgcolor=#E9E9E9
| 199261 Cassandralejoly ||  ||  || January 21, 2006 || Kitt Peak || Spacewatch || — || align=right | 3.0 km || 
|-id=262 bgcolor=#fefefe
| 199262 ||  || — || January 21, 2006 || Mount Lemmon || Mount Lemmon Survey || V || align=right | 1.1 km || 
|-id=263 bgcolor=#fefefe
| 199263 ||  || — || January 22, 2006 || Mount Lemmon || Mount Lemmon Survey || — || align=right | 1.2 km || 
|-id=264 bgcolor=#fefefe
| 199264 ||  || — || January 22, 2006 || Mount Lemmon || Mount Lemmon Survey || — || align=right | 1.1 km || 
|-id=265 bgcolor=#E9E9E9
| 199265 ||  || — || January 22, 2006 || Mount Lemmon || Mount Lemmon Survey || — || align=right | 2.5 km || 
|-id=266 bgcolor=#E9E9E9
| 199266 ||  || — || January 22, 2006 || Anderson Mesa || LONEOS || — || align=right | 5.1 km || 
|-id=267 bgcolor=#fefefe
| 199267 ||  || — || January 22, 2006 || Mount Lemmon || Mount Lemmon Survey || MAS || align=right | 1.00 km || 
|-id=268 bgcolor=#fefefe
| 199268 ||  || — || January 22, 2006 || Mount Lemmon || Mount Lemmon Survey || — || align=right | 1.5 km || 
|-id=269 bgcolor=#d6d6d6
| 199269 ||  || — || January 22, 2006 || Mount Lemmon || Mount Lemmon Survey || — || align=right | 4.9 km || 
|-id=270 bgcolor=#E9E9E9
| 199270 ||  || — || January 23, 2006 || Socorro || LINEAR || GEF || align=right | 1.7 km || 
|-id=271 bgcolor=#E9E9E9
| 199271 ||  || — || January 20, 2006 || Kitt Peak || Spacewatch || WIT || align=right | 1.6 km || 
|-id=272 bgcolor=#E9E9E9
| 199272 ||  || — || January 20, 2006 || Kitt Peak || Spacewatch || — || align=right | 1.6 km || 
|-id=273 bgcolor=#fefefe
| 199273 ||  || — || January 20, 2006 || Kitt Peak || Spacewatch || NYS || align=right data-sort-value="0.90" | 900 m || 
|-id=274 bgcolor=#fefefe
| 199274 ||  || — || January 20, 2006 || Kitt Peak || Spacewatch || MAS || align=right | 1.2 km || 
|-id=275 bgcolor=#E9E9E9
| 199275 ||  || — || January 21, 2006 || Kitt Peak || Spacewatch || — || align=right | 2.6 km || 
|-id=276 bgcolor=#d6d6d6
| 199276 ||  || — || January 21, 2006 || Kitt Peak || Spacewatch || KOR || align=right | 2.1 km || 
|-id=277 bgcolor=#d6d6d6
| 199277 ||  || — || January 21, 2006 || Kitt Peak || Spacewatch || — || align=right | 3.4 km || 
|-id=278 bgcolor=#d6d6d6
| 199278 ||  || — || January 23, 2006 || Mount Lemmon || Mount Lemmon Survey || — || align=right | 2.9 km || 
|-id=279 bgcolor=#E9E9E9
| 199279 ||  || — || January 21, 2006 || Kitt Peak || Spacewatch || PAD || align=right | 3.4 km || 
|-id=280 bgcolor=#d6d6d6
| 199280 ||  || — || January 23, 2006 || Catalina || CSS || EOS || align=right | 3.8 km || 
|-id=281 bgcolor=#d6d6d6
| 199281 ||  || — || January 23, 2006 || Mount Lemmon || Mount Lemmon Survey || — || align=right | 3.6 km || 
|-id=282 bgcolor=#E9E9E9
| 199282 ||  || — || January 23, 2006 || Mount Lemmon || Mount Lemmon Survey || — || align=right | 3.0 km || 
|-id=283 bgcolor=#E9E9E9
| 199283 ||  || — || January 23, 2006 || Mount Lemmon || Mount Lemmon Survey || — || align=right | 1.7 km || 
|-id=284 bgcolor=#fefefe
| 199284 ||  || — || January 24, 2006 || Socorro || LINEAR || NYS || align=right data-sort-value="0.99" | 990 m || 
|-id=285 bgcolor=#fefefe
| 199285 ||  || — || January 25, 2006 || Kitt Peak || Spacewatch || NYS || align=right data-sort-value="0.80" | 800 m || 
|-id=286 bgcolor=#fefefe
| 199286 ||  || — || January 25, 2006 || Kitt Peak || Spacewatch || NYS || align=right data-sort-value="0.96" | 960 m || 
|-id=287 bgcolor=#E9E9E9
| 199287 ||  || — || January 25, 2006 || Nyukasa || H. Kurosaki, A. Nakajima || — || align=right | 2.7 km || 
|-id=288 bgcolor=#fefefe
| 199288 ||  || — || January 22, 2006 || Mount Lemmon || Mount Lemmon Survey || — || align=right data-sort-value="0.82" | 820 m || 
|-id=289 bgcolor=#E9E9E9
| 199289 ||  || — || January 23, 2006 || Kitt Peak || Spacewatch || — || align=right | 3.9 km || 
|-id=290 bgcolor=#E9E9E9
| 199290 ||  || — || January 23, 2006 || Socorro || LINEAR || MRX || align=right | 1.7 km || 
|-id=291 bgcolor=#E9E9E9
| 199291 ||  || — || January 25, 2006 || Kitt Peak || Spacewatch || — || align=right | 2.9 km || 
|-id=292 bgcolor=#E9E9E9
| 199292 ||  || — || January 21, 2006 || Palomar || NEAT || EUN || align=right | 2.0 km || 
|-id=293 bgcolor=#E9E9E9
| 199293 ||  || — || January 23, 2006 || Kitt Peak || Spacewatch || — || align=right | 2.0 km || 
|-id=294 bgcolor=#fefefe
| 199294 ||  || — || January 23, 2006 || Kitt Peak || Spacewatch || MAS || align=right | 1.2 km || 
|-id=295 bgcolor=#E9E9E9
| 199295 ||  || — || January 23, 2006 || Kitt Peak || Spacewatch || AST || align=right | 1.9 km || 
|-id=296 bgcolor=#E9E9E9
| 199296 ||  || — || January 23, 2006 || Kitt Peak || Spacewatch || — || align=right | 2.6 km || 
|-id=297 bgcolor=#fefefe
| 199297 ||  || — || January 23, 2006 || Kitt Peak || Spacewatch || NYS || align=right data-sort-value="0.84" | 840 m || 
|-id=298 bgcolor=#d6d6d6
| 199298 ||  || — || January 23, 2006 || Kitt Peak || Spacewatch || HYG || align=right | 3.9 km || 
|-id=299 bgcolor=#E9E9E9
| 199299 ||  || — || January 23, 2006 || Kitt Peak || Spacewatch || — || align=right | 2.2 km || 
|-id=300 bgcolor=#E9E9E9
| 199300 ||  || — || January 23, 2006 || Kitt Peak || Spacewatch || — || align=right | 4.2 km || 
|}

199301–199400 

|-bgcolor=#fefefe
| 199301 ||  || — || January 23, 2006 || Kitt Peak || Spacewatch || — || align=right | 1.1 km || 
|-id=302 bgcolor=#d6d6d6
| 199302 ||  || — || January 23, 2006 || Kitt Peak || Spacewatch || — || align=right | 4.2 km || 
|-id=303 bgcolor=#fefefe
| 199303 ||  || — || January 25, 2006 || Kitt Peak || Spacewatch || MAS || align=right data-sort-value="0.90" | 900 m || 
|-id=304 bgcolor=#fefefe
| 199304 ||  || — || January 25, 2006 || Kitt Peak || Spacewatch || NYS || align=right | 1.0 km || 
|-id=305 bgcolor=#fefefe
| 199305 ||  || — || January 25, 2006 || Kitt Peak || Spacewatch || MAS || align=right | 1.0 km || 
|-id=306 bgcolor=#fefefe
| 199306 ||  || — || January 26, 2006 || Kitt Peak || Spacewatch || — || align=right | 1.8 km || 
|-id=307 bgcolor=#E9E9E9
| 199307 ||  || — || January 26, 2006 || Kitt Peak || Spacewatch || — || align=right | 3.7 km || 
|-id=308 bgcolor=#fefefe
| 199308 ||  || — || January 26, 2006 || Kitt Peak || Spacewatch || MAS || align=right data-sort-value="0.66" | 660 m || 
|-id=309 bgcolor=#fefefe
| 199309 ||  || — || January 27, 2006 || Socorro || LINEAR || EUT || align=right data-sort-value="0.97" | 970 m || 
|-id=310 bgcolor=#E9E9E9
| 199310 ||  || — || January 27, 2006 || Catalina || CSS || GEF || align=right | 2.3 km || 
|-id=311 bgcolor=#E9E9E9
| 199311 ||  || — || January 22, 2006 || Mount Lemmon || Mount Lemmon Survey || — || align=right | 1.2 km || 
|-id=312 bgcolor=#E9E9E9
| 199312 ||  || — || January 23, 2006 || Mount Lemmon || Mount Lemmon Survey || — || align=right data-sort-value="0.88" | 880 m || 
|-id=313 bgcolor=#E9E9E9
| 199313 ||  || — || January 23, 2006 || Mount Lemmon || Mount Lemmon Survey || — || align=right | 3.6 km || 
|-id=314 bgcolor=#d6d6d6
| 199314 ||  || — || January 23, 2006 || Mount Lemmon || Mount Lemmon Survey || KAR || align=right | 1.4 km || 
|-id=315 bgcolor=#d6d6d6
| 199315 ||  || — || January 23, 2006 || Mount Lemmon || Mount Lemmon Survey || EMA || align=right | 3.8 km || 
|-id=316 bgcolor=#fefefe
| 199316 ||  || — || January 23, 2006 || Mount Lemmon || Mount Lemmon Survey || — || align=right | 1.1 km || 
|-id=317 bgcolor=#E9E9E9
| 199317 ||  || — || January 25, 2006 || Kitt Peak || Spacewatch || HEN || align=right | 1.5 km || 
|-id=318 bgcolor=#E9E9E9
| 199318 ||  || — || January 25, 2006 || Kitt Peak || Spacewatch || — || align=right | 1.9 km || 
|-id=319 bgcolor=#E9E9E9
| 199319 ||  || — || January 25, 2006 || Kitt Peak || Spacewatch || — || align=right | 2.9 km || 
|-id=320 bgcolor=#fefefe
| 199320 ||  || — || January 26, 2006 || Kitt Peak || Spacewatch || MAS || align=right data-sort-value="0.62" | 620 m || 
|-id=321 bgcolor=#E9E9E9
| 199321 ||  || — || January 26, 2006 || Mount Lemmon || Mount Lemmon Survey || — || align=right | 1.2 km || 
|-id=322 bgcolor=#d6d6d6
| 199322 ||  || — || January 26, 2006 || Kitt Peak || Spacewatch || — || align=right | 3.7 km || 
|-id=323 bgcolor=#d6d6d6
| 199323 ||  || — || January 26, 2006 || Kitt Peak || Spacewatch || — || align=right | 3.7 km || 
|-id=324 bgcolor=#E9E9E9
| 199324 ||  || — || January 26, 2006 || Kitt Peak || Spacewatch || — || align=right | 5.0 km || 
|-id=325 bgcolor=#E9E9E9
| 199325 ||  || — || January 26, 2006 || Kitt Peak || Spacewatch || — || align=right | 1.4 km || 
|-id=326 bgcolor=#d6d6d6
| 199326 ||  || — || January 26, 2006 || Kitt Peak || Spacewatch || KOR || align=right | 2.3 km || 
|-id=327 bgcolor=#E9E9E9
| 199327 ||  || — || January 26, 2006 || Mount Lemmon || Mount Lemmon Survey || HEN || align=right | 1.7 km || 
|-id=328 bgcolor=#E9E9E9
| 199328 ||  || — || January 26, 2006 || Kitt Peak || Spacewatch || — || align=right | 1.6 km || 
|-id=329 bgcolor=#d6d6d6
| 199329 ||  || — || January 26, 2006 || Kitt Peak || Spacewatch || — || align=right | 4.5 km || 
|-id=330 bgcolor=#E9E9E9
| 199330 ||  || — || January 26, 2006 || Kitt Peak || Spacewatch || HEN || align=right | 1.6 km || 
|-id=331 bgcolor=#E9E9E9
| 199331 ||  || — || January 26, 2006 || Kitt Peak || Spacewatch || — || align=right | 2.6 km || 
|-id=332 bgcolor=#d6d6d6
| 199332 ||  || — || January 26, 2006 || Kitt Peak || Spacewatch || 628 || align=right | 2.6 km || 
|-id=333 bgcolor=#d6d6d6
| 199333 ||  || — || January 26, 2006 || Kitt Peak || Spacewatch || THM || align=right | 2.8 km || 
|-id=334 bgcolor=#E9E9E9
| 199334 ||  || — || January 26, 2006 || Mount Lemmon || Mount Lemmon Survey || — || align=right | 1.7 km || 
|-id=335 bgcolor=#E9E9E9
| 199335 ||  || — || January 26, 2006 || Mount Lemmon || Mount Lemmon Survey || — || align=right | 2.8 km || 
|-id=336 bgcolor=#E9E9E9
| 199336 ||  || — || January 28, 2006 || Mount Lemmon || Mount Lemmon Survey || — || align=right | 2.9 km || 
|-id=337 bgcolor=#E9E9E9
| 199337 ||  || — || January 31, 2006 || 7300 Observatory || W. K. Y. Yeung || WIT || align=right | 1.6 km || 
|-id=338 bgcolor=#fefefe
| 199338 ||  || — || January 22, 2006 || Catalina || CSS || — || align=right data-sort-value="0.99" | 990 m || 
|-id=339 bgcolor=#fefefe
| 199339 ||  || — || January 25, 2006 || Kitt Peak || Spacewatch || — || align=right | 1.1 km || 
|-id=340 bgcolor=#fefefe
| 199340 ||  || — || January 25, 2006 || Kitt Peak || Spacewatch || — || align=right | 1.1 km || 
|-id=341 bgcolor=#E9E9E9
| 199341 ||  || — || January 25, 2006 || Kitt Peak || Spacewatch || — || align=right | 2.1 km || 
|-id=342 bgcolor=#E9E9E9
| 199342 ||  || — || January 25, 2006 || Kitt Peak || Spacewatch || — || align=right | 1.6 km || 
|-id=343 bgcolor=#E9E9E9
| 199343 ||  || — || January 25, 2006 || Kitt Peak || Spacewatch || HEN || align=right | 1.3 km || 
|-id=344 bgcolor=#E9E9E9
| 199344 ||  || — || January 25, 2006 || Kitt Peak || Spacewatch || — || align=right | 1.9 km || 
|-id=345 bgcolor=#fefefe
| 199345 ||  || — || January 26, 2006 || Mount Lemmon || Mount Lemmon Survey || NYS || align=right data-sort-value="0.98" | 980 m || 
|-id=346 bgcolor=#fefefe
| 199346 ||  || — || January 26, 2006 || Anderson Mesa || LONEOS || KLI || align=right | 3.5 km || 
|-id=347 bgcolor=#fefefe
| 199347 ||  || — || January 26, 2006 || Catalina || CSS || FLO || align=right data-sort-value="0.89" | 890 m || 
|-id=348 bgcolor=#E9E9E9
| 199348 ||  || — || January 26, 2006 || Mount Lemmon || Mount Lemmon Survey || — || align=right | 3.4 km || 
|-id=349 bgcolor=#E9E9E9
| 199349 ||  || — || January 26, 2006 || Mount Lemmon || Mount Lemmon Survey || ADE || align=right | 4.5 km || 
|-id=350 bgcolor=#E9E9E9
| 199350 ||  || — || January 26, 2006 || Mount Lemmon || Mount Lemmon Survey || MAR || align=right | 1.9 km || 
|-id=351 bgcolor=#fefefe
| 199351 ||  || — || January 26, 2006 || Mount Lemmon || Mount Lemmon Survey || ERI || align=right | 2.9 km || 
|-id=352 bgcolor=#E9E9E9
| 199352 ||  || — || January 26, 2006 || Mount Lemmon || Mount Lemmon Survey || — || align=right | 2.3 km || 
|-id=353 bgcolor=#d6d6d6
| 199353 ||  || — || January 26, 2006 || Mount Lemmon || Mount Lemmon Survey || K-2 || align=right | 2.0 km || 
|-id=354 bgcolor=#E9E9E9
| 199354 ||  || — || January 27, 2006 || Mount Lemmon || Mount Lemmon Survey || — || align=right | 2.0 km || 
|-id=355 bgcolor=#fefefe
| 199355 ||  || — || January 27, 2006 || Mount Lemmon || Mount Lemmon Survey || NYS || align=right data-sort-value="0.62" | 620 m || 
|-id=356 bgcolor=#E9E9E9
| 199356 ||  || — || January 27, 2006 || Mount Lemmon || Mount Lemmon Survey || — || align=right | 1.6 km || 
|-id=357 bgcolor=#d6d6d6
| 199357 ||  || — || January 27, 2006 || Mount Lemmon || Mount Lemmon Survey || — || align=right | 5.7 km || 
|-id=358 bgcolor=#E9E9E9
| 199358 ||  || — || January 27, 2006 || Mount Lemmon || Mount Lemmon Survey || — || align=right | 2.5 km || 
|-id=359 bgcolor=#d6d6d6
| 199359 ||  || — || January 27, 2006 || Mount Lemmon || Mount Lemmon Survey || — || align=right | 4.6 km || 
|-id=360 bgcolor=#E9E9E9
| 199360 ||  || — || January 28, 2006 || Mount Lemmon || Mount Lemmon Survey || — || align=right | 2.2 km || 
|-id=361 bgcolor=#E9E9E9
| 199361 ||  || — || January 28, 2006 || Mount Lemmon || Mount Lemmon Survey || RAF || align=right | 1.4 km || 
|-id=362 bgcolor=#E9E9E9
| 199362 ||  || — || January 28, 2006 || Kitt Peak || Spacewatch || ADE || align=right | 2.2 km || 
|-id=363 bgcolor=#d6d6d6
| 199363 ||  || — || January 28, 2006 || Kitt Peak || Spacewatch || — || align=right | 2.9 km || 
|-id=364 bgcolor=#d6d6d6
| 199364 ||  || — || January 28, 2006 || Kitt Peak || Spacewatch || — || align=right | 3.9 km || 
|-id=365 bgcolor=#E9E9E9
| 199365 ||  || — || January 30, 2006 || Kitt Peak || Spacewatch || — || align=right | 1.1 km || 
|-id=366 bgcolor=#E9E9E9
| 199366 ||  || — || January 30, 2006 || Kitt Peak || Spacewatch || — || align=right | 2.2 km || 
|-id=367 bgcolor=#E9E9E9
| 199367 ||  || — || January 30, 2006 || Kitt Peak || Spacewatch || — || align=right | 3.1 km || 
|-id=368 bgcolor=#E9E9E9
| 199368 ||  || — || January 31, 2006 || Mount Lemmon || Mount Lemmon Survey || — || align=right | 2.4 km || 
|-id=369 bgcolor=#d6d6d6
| 199369 ||  || — || January 31, 2006 || Kitt Peak || Spacewatch || — || align=right | 3.7 km || 
|-id=370 bgcolor=#E9E9E9
| 199370 ||  || — || January 31, 2006 || Kitt Peak || Spacewatch || — || align=right | 2.8 km || 
|-id=371 bgcolor=#E9E9E9
| 199371 ||  || — || January 31, 2006 || Catalina || CSS || EUN || align=right | 2.4 km || 
|-id=372 bgcolor=#d6d6d6
| 199372 ||  || — || January 31, 2006 || Kitt Peak || Spacewatch || — || align=right | 5.1 km || 
|-id=373 bgcolor=#E9E9E9
| 199373 ||  || — || January 26, 2006 || Anderson Mesa || LONEOS || AER || align=right | 2.6 km || 
|-id=374 bgcolor=#fefefe
| 199374 ||  || — || January 28, 2006 || Mount Lemmon || Mount Lemmon Survey || FLO || align=right data-sort-value="0.94" | 940 m || 
|-id=375 bgcolor=#E9E9E9
| 199375 ||  || — || January 28, 2006 || Mount Lemmon || Mount Lemmon Survey || — || align=right | 3.2 km || 
|-id=376 bgcolor=#fefefe
| 199376 ||  || — || January 30, 2006 || Kitt Peak || Spacewatch || NYS || align=right | 2.7 km || 
|-id=377 bgcolor=#E9E9E9
| 199377 ||  || — || January 30, 2006 || Kitt Peak || Spacewatch || — || align=right | 1.4 km || 
|-id=378 bgcolor=#E9E9E9
| 199378 ||  || — || January 30, 2006 || Kitt Peak || Spacewatch || — || align=right | 1.2 km || 
|-id=379 bgcolor=#fefefe
| 199379 ||  || — || January 30, 2006 || Kitt Peak || Spacewatch || — || align=right | 1.1 km || 
|-id=380 bgcolor=#E9E9E9
| 199380 ||  || — || January 30, 2006 || Kitt Peak || Spacewatch || — || align=right | 2.9 km || 
|-id=381 bgcolor=#E9E9E9
| 199381 ||  || — || January 30, 2006 || Kitt Peak || Spacewatch || — || align=right | 2.7 km || 
|-id=382 bgcolor=#E9E9E9
| 199382 ||  || — || January 31, 2006 || Kitt Peak || Spacewatch || — || align=right | 2.5 km || 
|-id=383 bgcolor=#d6d6d6
| 199383 ||  || — || January 31, 2006 || Kitt Peak || Spacewatch || THM || align=right | 2.7 km || 
|-id=384 bgcolor=#fefefe
| 199384 ||  || — || January 31, 2006 || Kitt Peak || Spacewatch || — || align=right | 1.1 km || 
|-id=385 bgcolor=#E9E9E9
| 199385 ||  || — || January 31, 2006 || Kitt Peak || Spacewatch || — || align=right | 2.9 km || 
|-id=386 bgcolor=#fefefe
| 199386 ||  || — || January 31, 2006 || Mount Lemmon || Mount Lemmon Survey || V || align=right data-sort-value="0.72" | 720 m || 
|-id=387 bgcolor=#fefefe
| 199387 ||  || — || January 31, 2006 || Kitt Peak || Spacewatch || V || align=right data-sort-value="0.70" | 700 m || 
|-id=388 bgcolor=#d6d6d6
| 199388 ||  || — || January 31, 2006 || Kitt Peak || Spacewatch || — || align=right | 2.9 km || 
|-id=389 bgcolor=#fefefe
| 199389 ||  || — || January 31, 2006 || Kitt Peak || Spacewatch || — || align=right data-sort-value="0.67" | 670 m || 
|-id=390 bgcolor=#fefefe
| 199390 ||  || — || January 31, 2006 || Kitt Peak || Spacewatch || — || align=right data-sort-value="0.88" | 880 m || 
|-id=391 bgcolor=#E9E9E9
| 199391 ||  || — || January 31, 2006 || Kitt Peak || Spacewatch || — || align=right | 2.7 km || 
|-id=392 bgcolor=#E9E9E9
| 199392 ||  || — || January 31, 2006 || Kitt Peak || Spacewatch || — || align=right | 1.8 km || 
|-id=393 bgcolor=#d6d6d6
| 199393 ||  || — || January 31, 2006 || Kitt Peak || Spacewatch || K-2 || align=right | 1.9 km || 
|-id=394 bgcolor=#E9E9E9
| 199394 ||  || — || January 31, 2006 || Kitt Peak || Spacewatch || AGN || align=right | 1.5 km || 
|-id=395 bgcolor=#E9E9E9
| 199395 ||  || — || January 31, 2006 || Kitt Peak || Spacewatch || — || align=right | 4.0 km || 
|-id=396 bgcolor=#d6d6d6
| 199396 ||  || — || January 31, 2006 || Kitt Peak || Spacewatch || VER || align=right | 4.0 km || 
|-id=397 bgcolor=#E9E9E9
| 199397 ||  || — || January 31, 2006 || Kitt Peak || Spacewatch || — || align=right | 2.6 km || 
|-id=398 bgcolor=#E9E9E9
| 199398 ||  || — || January 31, 2006 || Kitt Peak || Spacewatch || — || align=right | 3.3 km || 
|-id=399 bgcolor=#fefefe
| 199399 ||  || — || January 27, 2006 || Catalina || CSS || — || align=right | 1.5 km || 
|-id=400 bgcolor=#fefefe
| 199400 ||  || — || January 26, 2006 || Kitt Peak || Spacewatch || MAS || align=right | 1.1 km || 
|}

199401–199500 

|-bgcolor=#fefefe
| 199401 ||  || — || January 23, 2006 || Mount Lemmon || Mount Lemmon Survey || — || align=right data-sort-value="0.97" | 970 m || 
|-id=402 bgcolor=#d6d6d6
| 199402 ||  || — || January 23, 2006 || Mount Lemmon || Mount Lemmon Survey || — || align=right | 4.3 km || 
|-id=403 bgcolor=#E9E9E9
| 199403 ||  || — || February 1, 2006 || Catalina || CSS || — || align=right | 2.4 km || 
|-id=404 bgcolor=#E9E9E9
| 199404 ||  || — || February 1, 2006 || Kitt Peak || Spacewatch || — || align=right | 1.1 km || 
|-id=405 bgcolor=#d6d6d6
| 199405 ||  || — || February 1, 2006 || Kitt Peak || Spacewatch || KOR || align=right | 2.2 km || 
|-id=406 bgcolor=#E9E9E9
| 199406 ||  || — || February 1, 2006 || Mount Lemmon || Mount Lemmon Survey || — || align=right | 1.1 km || 
|-id=407 bgcolor=#fefefe
| 199407 ||  || — || February 1, 2006 || Catalina || CSS || — || align=right | 2.0 km || 
|-id=408 bgcolor=#E9E9E9
| 199408 ||  || — || February 2, 2006 || Kitt Peak || Spacewatch || — || align=right | 2.9 km || 
|-id=409 bgcolor=#fefefe
| 199409 ||  || — || February 2, 2006 || Kitt Peak || Spacewatch || V || align=right | 1.3 km || 
|-id=410 bgcolor=#E9E9E9
| 199410 ||  || — || February 2, 2006 || Mount Lemmon || Mount Lemmon Survey || — || align=right | 1.4 km || 
|-id=411 bgcolor=#fefefe
| 199411 ||  || — || February 2, 2006 || Kitt Peak || Spacewatch || — || align=right | 1.3 km || 
|-id=412 bgcolor=#E9E9E9
| 199412 ||  || — || February 2, 2006 || Kitt Peak || Spacewatch || — || align=right | 1.4 km || 
|-id=413 bgcolor=#fefefe
| 199413 ||  || — || February 2, 2006 || Kitt Peak || Spacewatch || — || align=right | 2.2 km || 
|-id=414 bgcolor=#fefefe
| 199414 ||  || — || February 2, 2006 || Mount Lemmon || Mount Lemmon Survey || — || align=right | 1.5 km || 
|-id=415 bgcolor=#E9E9E9
| 199415 ||  || — || February 2, 2006 || Kitt Peak || Spacewatch || GEF || align=right | 2.2 km || 
|-id=416 bgcolor=#d6d6d6
| 199416 ||  || — || February 4, 2006 || Kitt Peak || Spacewatch || KAR || align=right | 1.7 km || 
|-id=417 bgcolor=#d6d6d6
| 199417 ||  || — || February 4, 2006 || Mount Lemmon || Mount Lemmon Survey || K-2 || align=right | 1.8 km || 
|-id=418 bgcolor=#E9E9E9
| 199418 ||  || — || February 4, 2006 || Mount Lemmon || Mount Lemmon Survey || NEM || align=right | 3.9 km || 
|-id=419 bgcolor=#E9E9E9
| 199419 || 2006 DG || — || February 21, 2006 || RAS || A. Lowe || — || align=right | 1.7 km || 
|-id=420 bgcolor=#fefefe
| 199420 ||  || — || February 20, 2006 || Kitt Peak || Spacewatch || — || align=right | 1.1 km || 
|-id=421 bgcolor=#fefefe
| 199421 ||  || — || February 20, 2006 || Kitt Peak || Spacewatch || MAS || align=right data-sort-value="0.86" | 860 m || 
|-id=422 bgcolor=#E9E9E9
| 199422 ||  || — || February 20, 2006 || Kitt Peak || Spacewatch || GEF || align=right | 1.6 km || 
|-id=423 bgcolor=#E9E9E9
| 199423 ||  || — || February 20, 2006 || Mount Lemmon || Mount Lemmon Survey || AGN || align=right | 1.9 km || 
|-id=424 bgcolor=#E9E9E9
| 199424 ||  || — || February 20, 2006 || Catalina || CSS || — || align=right | 4.0 km || 
|-id=425 bgcolor=#d6d6d6
| 199425 ||  || — || February 20, 2006 || Kitt Peak || Spacewatch || HYG || align=right | 5.1 km || 
|-id=426 bgcolor=#E9E9E9
| 199426 ||  || — || February 20, 2006 || Kitt Peak || Spacewatch || — || align=right | 2.1 km || 
|-id=427 bgcolor=#E9E9E9
| 199427 ||  || — || February 20, 2006 || Catalina || CSS || — || align=right | 3.2 km || 
|-id=428 bgcolor=#E9E9E9
| 199428 ||  || — || February 21, 2006 || Catalina || CSS || — || align=right | 2.3 km || 
|-id=429 bgcolor=#fefefe
| 199429 ||  || — || February 22, 2006 || Catalina || CSS || ERI || align=right | 3.0 km || 
|-id=430 bgcolor=#d6d6d6
| 199430 ||  || — || February 20, 2006 || Kitt Peak || Spacewatch || EMA || align=right | 4.2 km || 
|-id=431 bgcolor=#fefefe
| 199431 ||  || — || February 20, 2006 || Kitt Peak || Spacewatch || NYS || align=right data-sort-value="0.85" | 850 m || 
|-id=432 bgcolor=#d6d6d6
| 199432 ||  || — || February 20, 2006 || Kitt Peak || Spacewatch || THM || align=right | 3.7 km || 
|-id=433 bgcolor=#E9E9E9
| 199433 ||  || — || February 20, 2006 || Kitt Peak || Spacewatch || MRX || align=right | 1.6 km || 
|-id=434 bgcolor=#E9E9E9
| 199434 ||  || — || February 20, 2006 || Kitt Peak || Spacewatch || — || align=right | 1.7 km || 
|-id=435 bgcolor=#E9E9E9
| 199435 ||  || — || February 20, 2006 || Kitt Peak || Spacewatch || — || align=right | 3.1 km || 
|-id=436 bgcolor=#E9E9E9
| 199436 ||  || — || February 20, 2006 || Kitt Peak || Spacewatch || — || align=right | 2.0 km || 
|-id=437 bgcolor=#E9E9E9
| 199437 ||  || — || February 20, 2006 || Mount Lemmon || Mount Lemmon Survey || — || align=right | 1.8 km || 
|-id=438 bgcolor=#E9E9E9
| 199438 ||  || — || February 20, 2006 || Kitt Peak || Spacewatch || — || align=right | 2.7 km || 
|-id=439 bgcolor=#d6d6d6
| 199439 ||  || — || February 20, 2006 || Mount Lemmon || Mount Lemmon Survey || — || align=right | 2.8 km || 
|-id=440 bgcolor=#d6d6d6
| 199440 ||  || — || February 20, 2006 || Mount Lemmon || Mount Lemmon Survey || — || align=right | 3.6 km || 
|-id=441 bgcolor=#d6d6d6
| 199441 ||  || — || February 20, 2006 || Mount Lemmon || Mount Lemmon Survey || — || align=right | 3.6 km || 
|-id=442 bgcolor=#E9E9E9
| 199442 ||  || — || February 20, 2006 || Kitt Peak || Spacewatch || — || align=right | 2.1 km || 
|-id=443 bgcolor=#d6d6d6
| 199443 ||  || — || February 20, 2006 || Kitt Peak || Spacewatch || — || align=right | 3.5 km || 
|-id=444 bgcolor=#d6d6d6
| 199444 ||  || — || February 20, 2006 || Kitt Peak || Spacewatch || — || align=right | 6.2 km || 
|-id=445 bgcolor=#d6d6d6
| 199445 ||  || — || February 20, 2006 || Mount Lemmon || Mount Lemmon Survey || KOR || align=right | 1.9 km || 
|-id=446 bgcolor=#E9E9E9
| 199446 ||  || — || February 20, 2006 || Mount Lemmon || Mount Lemmon Survey || AGN || align=right | 1.7 km || 
|-id=447 bgcolor=#E9E9E9
| 199447 ||  || — || February 20, 2006 || Mount Lemmon || Mount Lemmon Survey || — || align=right | 2.4 km || 
|-id=448 bgcolor=#d6d6d6
| 199448 ||  || — || February 20, 2006 || Mount Lemmon || Mount Lemmon Survey || — || align=right | 4.2 km || 
|-id=449 bgcolor=#E9E9E9
| 199449 ||  || — || February 21, 2006 || Anderson Mesa || LONEOS || PAD || align=right | 2.2 km || 
|-id=450 bgcolor=#E9E9E9
| 199450 ||  || — || February 21, 2006 || Anderson Mesa || LONEOS || AGN || align=right | 1.6 km || 
|-id=451 bgcolor=#fefefe
| 199451 ||  || — || February 21, 2006 || Anderson Mesa || LONEOS || MAS || align=right data-sort-value="0.88" | 880 m || 
|-id=452 bgcolor=#E9E9E9
| 199452 ||  || — || February 21, 2006 || Anderson Mesa || LONEOS || — || align=right | 3.5 km || 
|-id=453 bgcolor=#d6d6d6
| 199453 ||  || — || February 21, 2006 || Mount Lemmon || Mount Lemmon Survey || KOR || align=right | 2.1 km || 
|-id=454 bgcolor=#E9E9E9
| 199454 ||  || — || February 22, 2006 || Catalina || CSS || EUN || align=right | 1.9 km || 
|-id=455 bgcolor=#d6d6d6
| 199455 ||  || — || February 22, 2006 || Catalina || CSS || — || align=right | 5.8 km || 
|-id=456 bgcolor=#E9E9E9
| 199456 ||  || — || February 23, 2006 || Kitt Peak || Spacewatch || HEN || align=right | 1.8 km || 
|-id=457 bgcolor=#E9E9E9
| 199457 ||  || — || February 23, 2006 || Anderson Mesa || LONEOS || — || align=right | 3.7 km || 
|-id=458 bgcolor=#E9E9E9
| 199458 ||  || — || February 20, 2006 || Mount Lemmon || Mount Lemmon Survey || — || align=right | 2.3 km || 
|-id=459 bgcolor=#E9E9E9
| 199459 ||  || — || February 20, 2006 || Mount Lemmon || Mount Lemmon Survey || — || align=right | 3.0 km || 
|-id=460 bgcolor=#d6d6d6
| 199460 ||  || — || February 20, 2006 || Mount Lemmon || Mount Lemmon Survey || — || align=right | 3.9 km || 
|-id=461 bgcolor=#E9E9E9
| 199461 ||  || — || February 24, 2006 || Palomar || NEAT || — || align=right | 2.2 km || 
|-id=462 bgcolor=#E9E9E9
| 199462 ||  || — || February 24, 2006 || Kitt Peak || Spacewatch || — || align=right | 2.0 km || 
|-id=463 bgcolor=#E9E9E9
| 199463 ||  || — || February 24, 2006 || Mount Lemmon || Mount Lemmon Survey || HEN || align=right | 1.7 km || 
|-id=464 bgcolor=#E9E9E9
| 199464 ||  || — || February 24, 2006 || Mount Lemmon || Mount Lemmon Survey || — || align=right | 1.2 km || 
|-id=465 bgcolor=#d6d6d6
| 199465 ||  || — || February 24, 2006 || Kitt Peak || Spacewatch || KOR || align=right | 2.3 km || 
|-id=466 bgcolor=#d6d6d6
| 199466 ||  || — || February 24, 2006 || Mount Lemmon || Mount Lemmon Survey || KOR || align=right | 2.0 km || 
|-id=467 bgcolor=#E9E9E9
| 199467 ||  || — || February 24, 2006 || Mount Lemmon || Mount Lemmon Survey || — || align=right | 3.7 km || 
|-id=468 bgcolor=#E9E9E9
| 199468 ||  || — || February 24, 2006 || Kitt Peak || Spacewatch || WIT || align=right | 1.5 km || 
|-id=469 bgcolor=#fefefe
| 199469 ||  || — || February 24, 2006 || Kitt Peak || Spacewatch || — || align=right data-sort-value="0.78" | 780 m || 
|-id=470 bgcolor=#fefefe
| 199470 ||  || — || February 25, 2006 || Socorro || LINEAR || — || align=right data-sort-value="0.85" | 850 m || 
|-id=471 bgcolor=#E9E9E9
| 199471 ||  || — || February 20, 2006 || Catalina || CSS || — || align=right | 3.0 km || 
|-id=472 bgcolor=#E9E9E9
| 199472 ||  || — || February 20, 2006 || Catalina || CSS || HOF || align=right | 4.3 km || 
|-id=473 bgcolor=#d6d6d6
| 199473 ||  || — || February 20, 2006 || Catalina || CSS || — || align=right | 4.4 km || 
|-id=474 bgcolor=#E9E9E9
| 199474 ||  || — || February 21, 2006 || Catalina || CSS || — || align=right | 4.4 km || 
|-id=475 bgcolor=#E9E9E9
| 199475 ||  || — || February 22, 2006 || Catalina || CSS || — || align=right | 2.6 km || 
|-id=476 bgcolor=#fefefe
| 199476 ||  || — || February 22, 2006 || Socorro || LINEAR || NYS || align=right data-sort-value="0.86" | 860 m || 
|-id=477 bgcolor=#E9E9E9
| 199477 ||  || — || February 22, 2006 || Anderson Mesa || LONEOS || — || align=right | 3.7 km || 
|-id=478 bgcolor=#fefefe
| 199478 ||  || — || February 22, 2006 || Anderson Mesa || LONEOS || NYS || align=right | 3.2 km || 
|-id=479 bgcolor=#E9E9E9
| 199479 ||  || — || February 22, 2006 || Mount Lemmon || Mount Lemmon Survey || MAR || align=right | 1.9 km || 
|-id=480 bgcolor=#E9E9E9
| 199480 ||  || — || February 23, 2006 || Kitt Peak || Spacewatch || — || align=right | 1.2 km || 
|-id=481 bgcolor=#E9E9E9
| 199481 ||  || — || February 24, 2006 || Kitt Peak || Spacewatch || AGN || align=right | 1.5 km || 
|-id=482 bgcolor=#fefefe
| 199482 ||  || — || February 24, 2006 || Kitt Peak || Spacewatch || — || align=right | 1.1 km || 
|-id=483 bgcolor=#d6d6d6
| 199483 ||  || — || February 24, 2006 || Kitt Peak || Spacewatch || — || align=right | 6.1 km || 
|-id=484 bgcolor=#E9E9E9
| 199484 ||  || — || February 24, 2006 || Kitt Peak || Spacewatch || — || align=right | 1.5 km || 
|-id=485 bgcolor=#d6d6d6
| 199485 ||  || — || February 24, 2006 || Kitt Peak || Spacewatch || — || align=right | 2.9 km || 
|-id=486 bgcolor=#fefefe
| 199486 ||  || — || February 24, 2006 || Kitt Peak || Spacewatch || — || align=right | 1.3 km || 
|-id=487 bgcolor=#d6d6d6
| 199487 ||  || — || February 24, 2006 || Kitt Peak || Spacewatch || — || align=right | 4.1 km || 
|-id=488 bgcolor=#d6d6d6
| 199488 ||  || — || February 24, 2006 || Kitt Peak || Spacewatch || — || align=right | 2.9 km || 
|-id=489 bgcolor=#fefefe
| 199489 ||  || — || February 24, 2006 || Kitt Peak || Spacewatch || NYS || align=right data-sort-value="0.79" | 790 m || 
|-id=490 bgcolor=#E9E9E9
| 199490 ||  || — || February 24, 2006 || Kitt Peak || Spacewatch || AGN || align=right | 1.6 km || 
|-id=491 bgcolor=#E9E9E9
| 199491 ||  || — || February 24, 2006 || Kitt Peak || Spacewatch || HOF || align=right | 4.2 km || 
|-id=492 bgcolor=#d6d6d6
| 199492 ||  || — || February 24, 2006 || Kitt Peak || Spacewatch || — || align=right | 3.6 km || 
|-id=493 bgcolor=#d6d6d6
| 199493 ||  || — || February 24, 2006 || Kitt Peak || Spacewatch || — || align=right | 2.6 km || 
|-id=494 bgcolor=#d6d6d6
| 199494 ||  || — || February 24, 2006 || Kitt Peak || Spacewatch || KOR || align=right | 1.7 km || 
|-id=495 bgcolor=#d6d6d6
| 199495 ||  || — || February 24, 2006 || Kitt Peak || Spacewatch || THM || align=right | 3.3 km || 
|-id=496 bgcolor=#d6d6d6
| 199496 ||  || — || February 24, 2006 || Kitt Peak || Spacewatch || KAR || align=right | 1.9 km || 
|-id=497 bgcolor=#d6d6d6
| 199497 ||  || — || February 24, 2006 || Kitt Peak || Spacewatch || — || align=right | 2.6 km || 
|-id=498 bgcolor=#d6d6d6
| 199498 ||  || — || February 24, 2006 || Kitt Peak || Spacewatch || — || align=right | 3.0 km || 
|-id=499 bgcolor=#d6d6d6
| 199499 ||  || — || February 24, 2006 || Kitt Peak || Spacewatch || EOS || align=right | 2.8 km || 
|-id=500 bgcolor=#E9E9E9
| 199500 ||  || — || February 25, 2006 || Mount Lemmon || Mount Lemmon Survey || — || align=right | 2.5 km || 
|}

199501–199600 

|-bgcolor=#E9E9E9
| 199501 ||  || — || February 25, 2006 || Kitt Peak || Spacewatch || — || align=right | 1.5 km || 
|-id=502 bgcolor=#d6d6d6
| 199502 ||  || — || February 25, 2006 || Socorro || LINEAR || — || align=right | 4.8 km || 
|-id=503 bgcolor=#d6d6d6
| 199503 ||  || — || February 25, 2006 || Kitt Peak || Spacewatch || — || align=right | 2.9 km || 
|-id=504 bgcolor=#E9E9E9
| 199504 ||  || — || February 27, 2006 || Mount Lemmon || Mount Lemmon Survey || — || align=right | 1.2 km || 
|-id=505 bgcolor=#E9E9E9
| 199505 ||  || — || February 27, 2006 || Kitt Peak || Spacewatch || — || align=right | 2.3 km || 
|-id=506 bgcolor=#E9E9E9
| 199506 ||  || — || February 27, 2006 || Kitt Peak || Spacewatch || — || align=right | 3.1 km || 
|-id=507 bgcolor=#E9E9E9
| 199507 ||  || — || February 28, 2006 || Mount Lemmon || Mount Lemmon Survey || — || align=right | 3.2 km || 
|-id=508 bgcolor=#d6d6d6
| 199508 ||  || — || February 23, 2006 || Anderson Mesa || LONEOS || — || align=right | 5.0 km || 
|-id=509 bgcolor=#d6d6d6
| 199509 ||  || — || February 24, 2006 || Catalina || CSS || BRA || align=right | 3.2 km || 
|-id=510 bgcolor=#E9E9E9
| 199510 ||  || — || February 24, 2006 || Anderson Mesa || LONEOS || — || align=right | 3.5 km || 
|-id=511 bgcolor=#d6d6d6
| 199511 ||  || — || February 24, 2006 || Mount Lemmon || Mount Lemmon Survey || KOR || align=right | 1.9 km || 
|-id=512 bgcolor=#d6d6d6
| 199512 ||  || — || February 24, 2006 || Kitt Peak || Spacewatch || KOR || align=right | 1.4 km || 
|-id=513 bgcolor=#E9E9E9
| 199513 ||  || — || February 25, 2006 || Mount Lemmon || Mount Lemmon Survey || — || align=right | 2.1 km || 
|-id=514 bgcolor=#E9E9E9
| 199514 ||  || — || February 25, 2006 || Mount Lemmon || Mount Lemmon Survey || — || align=right | 3.2 km || 
|-id=515 bgcolor=#E9E9E9
| 199515 ||  || — || February 25, 2006 || Mount Lemmon || Mount Lemmon Survey || AGN || align=right | 1.6 km || 
|-id=516 bgcolor=#fefefe
| 199516 ||  || — || February 25, 2006 || Kitt Peak || Spacewatch || NYS || align=right data-sort-value="0.84" | 840 m || 
|-id=517 bgcolor=#E9E9E9
| 199517 ||  || — || February 25, 2006 || Kitt Peak || Spacewatch || — || align=right | 2.4 km || 
|-id=518 bgcolor=#E9E9E9
| 199518 ||  || — || February 25, 2006 || Kitt Peak || Spacewatch || HEN || align=right | 1.7 km || 
|-id=519 bgcolor=#d6d6d6
| 199519 ||  || — || February 25, 2006 || Mount Lemmon || Mount Lemmon Survey || KOR || align=right | 1.9 km || 
|-id=520 bgcolor=#E9E9E9
| 199520 ||  || — || February 25, 2006 || Mount Lemmon || Mount Lemmon Survey || — || align=right | 3.4 km || 
|-id=521 bgcolor=#E9E9E9
| 199521 ||  || — || February 25, 2006 || Mount Lemmon || Mount Lemmon Survey || HOF || align=right | 4.4 km || 
|-id=522 bgcolor=#d6d6d6
| 199522 ||  || — || February 25, 2006 || Kitt Peak || Spacewatch || KOR || align=right | 1.9 km || 
|-id=523 bgcolor=#E9E9E9
| 199523 ||  || — || February 25, 2006 || Kitt Peak || Spacewatch || — || align=right | 1.6 km || 
|-id=524 bgcolor=#E9E9E9
| 199524 ||  || — || February 25, 2006 || Kitt Peak || Spacewatch || HEN || align=right | 1.5 km || 
|-id=525 bgcolor=#E9E9E9
| 199525 ||  || — || February 27, 2006 || Kitt Peak || Spacewatch || — || align=right | 2.0 km || 
|-id=526 bgcolor=#fefefe
| 199526 ||  || — || February 27, 2006 || Mount Lemmon || Mount Lemmon Survey || NYS || align=right data-sort-value="0.73" | 730 m || 
|-id=527 bgcolor=#E9E9E9
| 199527 ||  || — || February 27, 2006 || Mount Lemmon || Mount Lemmon Survey || AGN || align=right | 2.0 km || 
|-id=528 bgcolor=#d6d6d6
| 199528 ||  || — || February 27, 2006 || Kitt Peak || Spacewatch || — || align=right | 3.9 km || 
|-id=529 bgcolor=#d6d6d6
| 199529 ||  || — || February 27, 2006 || Kitt Peak || Spacewatch || — || align=right | 3.8 km || 
|-id=530 bgcolor=#E9E9E9
| 199530 ||  || — || February 27, 2006 || Kitt Peak || Spacewatch || — || align=right | 2.3 km || 
|-id=531 bgcolor=#E9E9E9
| 199531 ||  || — || February 27, 2006 || Kitt Peak || Spacewatch || — || align=right | 1.7 km || 
|-id=532 bgcolor=#E9E9E9
| 199532 ||  || — || February 24, 2006 || Catalina || CSS || EUN || align=right | 2.0 km || 
|-id=533 bgcolor=#E9E9E9
| 199533 ||  || — || February 24, 2006 || Catalina || CSS || MAR || align=right | 1.7 km || 
|-id=534 bgcolor=#d6d6d6
| 199534 ||  || — || February 27, 2006 || Mount Lemmon || Mount Lemmon Survey || THM || align=right | 3.7 km || 
|-id=535 bgcolor=#E9E9E9
| 199535 ||  || — || February 24, 2006 || Catalina || CSS || AER || align=right | 2.9 km || 
|-id=536 bgcolor=#d6d6d6
| 199536 ||  || — || February 20, 2006 || Catalina || CSS || — || align=right | 6.8 km || 
|-id=537 bgcolor=#d6d6d6
| 199537 ||  || — || February 20, 2006 || Socorro || LINEAR || — || align=right | 5.2 km || 
|-id=538 bgcolor=#E9E9E9
| 199538 ||  || — || February 22, 2006 || Anderson Mesa || LONEOS || — || align=right | 3.8 km || 
|-id=539 bgcolor=#fefefe
| 199539 ||  || — || February 22, 2006 || Catalina || CSS || V || align=right | 1.1 km || 
|-id=540 bgcolor=#E9E9E9
| 199540 ||  || — || February 25, 2006 || Mount Lemmon || Mount Lemmon Survey || — || align=right | 2.2 km || 
|-id=541 bgcolor=#E9E9E9
| 199541 ||  || — || February 25, 2006 || Mount Lemmon || Mount Lemmon Survey || — || align=right | 2.7 km || 
|-id=542 bgcolor=#E9E9E9
| 199542 ||  || — || February 25, 2006 || Kitt Peak || Spacewatch || — || align=right | 3.1 km || 
|-id=543 bgcolor=#d6d6d6
| 199543 ||  || — || February 20, 2006 || Kitt Peak || Spacewatch || — || align=right | 3.9 km || 
|-id=544 bgcolor=#E9E9E9
| 199544 ||  || — || February 25, 2006 || Mount Lemmon || Mount Lemmon Survey || — || align=right | 3.1 km || 
|-id=545 bgcolor=#d6d6d6
| 199545 ||  || — || February 25, 2006 || Mount Lemmon || Mount Lemmon Survey || KOR || align=right | 1.7 km || 
|-id=546 bgcolor=#E9E9E9
| 199546 ||  || — || February 21, 2006 || Mount Lemmon || Mount Lemmon Survey || — || align=right | 1.9 km || 
|-id=547 bgcolor=#fefefe
| 199547 ||  || — || March 2, 2006 || Kitt Peak || Spacewatch || — || align=right | 1.0 km || 
|-id=548 bgcolor=#E9E9E9
| 199548 ||  || — || March 2, 2006 || Kitt Peak || Spacewatch || — || align=right | 3.4 km || 
|-id=549 bgcolor=#E9E9E9
| 199549 ||  || — || March 2, 2006 || Kitt Peak || Spacewatch || — || align=right | 2.1 km || 
|-id=550 bgcolor=#E9E9E9
| 199550 ||  || — || March 2, 2006 || Kitt Peak || Spacewatch || AST || align=right | 3.6 km || 
|-id=551 bgcolor=#d6d6d6
| 199551 ||  || — || March 2, 2006 || Mount Lemmon || Mount Lemmon Survey || KOR || align=right | 2.0 km || 
|-id=552 bgcolor=#d6d6d6
| 199552 ||  || — || March 2, 2006 || Mount Lemmon || Mount Lemmon Survey || — || align=right | 3.3 km || 
|-id=553 bgcolor=#E9E9E9
| 199553 ||  || — || March 2, 2006 || Kitt Peak || Spacewatch || HEN || align=right | 1.5 km || 
|-id=554 bgcolor=#E9E9E9
| 199554 ||  || — || March 2, 2006 || Kitt Peak || Spacewatch || WIT || align=right | 1.5 km || 
|-id=555 bgcolor=#d6d6d6
| 199555 ||  || — || March 3, 2006 || Kitt Peak || Spacewatch || HYG || align=right | 2.9 km || 
|-id=556 bgcolor=#d6d6d6
| 199556 ||  || — || March 3, 2006 || Socorro || LINEAR || HYG || align=right | 5.1 km || 
|-id=557 bgcolor=#fefefe
| 199557 ||  || — || March 3, 2006 || Kitt Peak || Spacewatch || — || align=right | 1.1 km || 
|-id=558 bgcolor=#d6d6d6
| 199558 ||  || — || March 3, 2006 || Kitt Peak || Spacewatch || — || align=right | 4.5 km || 
|-id=559 bgcolor=#d6d6d6
| 199559 ||  || — || March 3, 2006 || Kitt Peak || Spacewatch || KOR || align=right | 2.1 km || 
|-id=560 bgcolor=#E9E9E9
| 199560 ||  || — || March 4, 2006 || Kitt Peak || Spacewatch || — || align=right | 2.9 km || 
|-id=561 bgcolor=#E9E9E9
| 199561 ||  || — || March 4, 2006 || Kitt Peak || Spacewatch || — || align=right | 3.6 km || 
|-id=562 bgcolor=#E9E9E9
| 199562 ||  || — || March 4, 2006 || Catalina || CSS || — || align=right | 2.1 km || 
|-id=563 bgcolor=#E9E9E9
| 199563 ||  || — || March 4, 2006 || Catalina || CSS || — || align=right | 4.0 km || 
|-id=564 bgcolor=#d6d6d6
| 199564 ||  || — || March 4, 2006 || Catalina || CSS || — || align=right | 6.1 km || 
|-id=565 bgcolor=#E9E9E9
| 199565 ||  || — || March 5, 2006 || Kitt Peak || Spacewatch || — || align=right | 1.7 km || 
|-id=566 bgcolor=#E9E9E9
| 199566 ||  || — || March 4, 2006 || Kitt Peak || Spacewatch || HEN || align=right | 1.6 km || 
|-id=567 bgcolor=#d6d6d6
| 199567 ||  || — || March 4, 2006 || Kitt Peak || Spacewatch || — || align=right | 4.8 km || 
|-id=568 bgcolor=#E9E9E9
| 199568 ||  || — || March 4, 2006 || Kitt Peak || Spacewatch || — || align=right | 3.2 km || 
|-id=569 bgcolor=#d6d6d6
| 199569 ||  || — || March 5, 2006 || Kitt Peak || Spacewatch || — || align=right | 3.6 km || 
|-id=570 bgcolor=#fefefe
| 199570 ||  || — || March 5, 2006 || Kitt Peak || Spacewatch || — || align=right | 1.5 km || 
|-id=571 bgcolor=#E9E9E9
| 199571 ||  || — || March 5, 2006 || Kitt Peak || Spacewatch || DOR || align=right | 3.9 km || 
|-id=572 bgcolor=#E9E9E9
| 199572 ||  || — || March 5, 2006 || Kitt Peak || Spacewatch || — || align=right | 2.0 km || 
|-id=573 bgcolor=#d6d6d6
| 199573 ||  || — || March 8, 2006 || Kitt Peak || Spacewatch || EOS || align=right | 2.1 km || 
|-id=574 bgcolor=#E9E9E9
| 199574 Webbert ||  ||  || March 2, 2006 || Kitt Peak || M. W. Buie || — || align=right data-sort-value="0.79" | 790 m || 
|-id=575 bgcolor=#d6d6d6
| 199575 ||  || — || March 5, 2006 || Kitt Peak || Spacewatch || — || align=right | 3.0 km || 
|-id=576 bgcolor=#E9E9E9
| 199576 ||  || — || March 3, 2006 || Kitt Peak || Spacewatch || NEM || align=right | 3.2 km || 
|-id=577 bgcolor=#E9E9E9
| 199577 ||  || — || March 21, 2006 || Mount Lemmon || Mount Lemmon Survey || — || align=right | 1.1 km || 
|-id=578 bgcolor=#d6d6d6
| 199578 ||  || — || March 23, 2006 || Kitt Peak || Spacewatch || HYG || align=right | 3.9 km || 
|-id=579 bgcolor=#E9E9E9
| 199579 ||  || — || March 23, 2006 || Kitt Peak || Spacewatch || — || align=right | 1.1 km || 
|-id=580 bgcolor=#d6d6d6
| 199580 ||  || — || March 23, 2006 || Kitt Peak || Spacewatch || KOR || align=right | 1.8 km || 
|-id=581 bgcolor=#E9E9E9
| 199581 ||  || — || March 23, 2006 || Mount Lemmon || Mount Lemmon Survey || — || align=right | 1.3 km || 
|-id=582 bgcolor=#d6d6d6
| 199582 ||  || — || March 23, 2006 || Mount Lemmon || Mount Lemmon Survey || — || align=right | 3.4 km || 
|-id=583 bgcolor=#E9E9E9
| 199583 ||  || — || March 21, 2006 || Socorro || LINEAR || — || align=right | 4.7 km || 
|-id=584 bgcolor=#d6d6d6
| 199584 ||  || — || March 23, 2006 || Kitt Peak || Spacewatch || — || align=right | 4.6 km || 
|-id=585 bgcolor=#d6d6d6
| 199585 ||  || — || March 23, 2006 || Kitt Peak || Spacewatch || — || align=right | 5.3 km || 
|-id=586 bgcolor=#d6d6d6
| 199586 ||  || — || March 23, 2006 || Kitt Peak || Spacewatch || — || align=right | 3.5 km || 
|-id=587 bgcolor=#E9E9E9
| 199587 ||  || — || March 23, 2006 || Mount Lemmon || Mount Lemmon Survey || NEM || align=right | 2.7 km || 
|-id=588 bgcolor=#d6d6d6
| 199588 ||  || — || March 23, 2006 || Mount Lemmon || Mount Lemmon Survey || — || align=right | 3.8 km || 
|-id=589 bgcolor=#E9E9E9
| 199589 ||  || — || March 23, 2006 || Kitt Peak || Spacewatch || — || align=right | 1.6 km || 
|-id=590 bgcolor=#d6d6d6
| 199590 ||  || — || March 23, 2006 || Kitt Peak || Spacewatch || — || align=right | 4.3 km || 
|-id=591 bgcolor=#d6d6d6
| 199591 ||  || — || March 23, 2006 || Mount Lemmon || Mount Lemmon Survey || EOS || align=right | 3.1 km || 
|-id=592 bgcolor=#d6d6d6
| 199592 ||  || — || March 23, 2006 || Mount Lemmon || Mount Lemmon Survey || K-2 || align=right | 1.7 km || 
|-id=593 bgcolor=#d6d6d6
| 199593 ||  || — || March 23, 2006 || Mount Lemmon || Mount Lemmon Survey || K-2 || align=right | 2.0 km || 
|-id=594 bgcolor=#E9E9E9
| 199594 ||  || — || March 23, 2006 || Mount Lemmon || Mount Lemmon Survey || HEN || align=right | 1.4 km || 
|-id=595 bgcolor=#d6d6d6
| 199595 ||  || — || March 23, 2006 || Mount Lemmon || Mount Lemmon Survey || — || align=right | 2.9 km || 
|-id=596 bgcolor=#E9E9E9
| 199596 ||  || — || March 24, 2006 || Mount Lemmon || Mount Lemmon Survey || — || align=right | 3.3 km || 
|-id=597 bgcolor=#E9E9E9
| 199597 ||  || — || March 24, 2006 || Kitt Peak || Spacewatch || — || align=right | 2.4 km || 
|-id=598 bgcolor=#E9E9E9
| 199598 ||  || — || March 24, 2006 || Kitt Peak || Spacewatch || — || align=right | 2.2 km || 
|-id=599 bgcolor=#E9E9E9
| 199599 ||  || — || March 24, 2006 || Kitt Peak || Spacewatch || — || align=right | 1.2 km || 
|-id=600 bgcolor=#E9E9E9
| 199600 ||  || — || March 24, 2006 || Kitt Peak || Spacewatch || HOF || align=right | 4.3 km || 
|}

199601–199700 

|-bgcolor=#E9E9E9
| 199601 ||  || — || March 24, 2006 || Kitt Peak || Spacewatch || — || align=right | 1.8 km || 
|-id=602 bgcolor=#d6d6d6
| 199602 ||  || — || March 24, 2006 || Kitt Peak || Spacewatch || — || align=right | 3.4 km || 
|-id=603 bgcolor=#E9E9E9
| 199603 ||  || — || March 24, 2006 || Kitt Peak || Spacewatch || — || align=right | 3.3 km || 
|-id=604 bgcolor=#d6d6d6
| 199604 ||  || — || March 24, 2006 || Socorro || LINEAR || — || align=right | 5.1 km || 
|-id=605 bgcolor=#E9E9E9
| 199605 ||  || — || March 24, 2006 || Catalina || CSS || — || align=right | 2.5 km || 
|-id=606 bgcolor=#d6d6d6
| 199606 ||  || — || March 24, 2006 || Mount Lemmon || Mount Lemmon Survey || — || align=right | 5.3 km || 
|-id=607 bgcolor=#E9E9E9
| 199607 ||  || — || March 25, 2006 || Palomar || NEAT || — || align=right | 4.3 km || 
|-id=608 bgcolor=#d6d6d6
| 199608 ||  || — || March 24, 2006 || Kitt Peak || Spacewatch || — || align=right | 4.7 km || 
|-id=609 bgcolor=#E9E9E9
| 199609 ||  || — || March 21, 2006 || Socorro || LINEAR || — || align=right | 3.5 km || 
|-id=610 bgcolor=#d6d6d6
| 199610 ||  || — || March 24, 2006 || Catalina || CSS || — || align=right | 5.2 km || 
|-id=611 bgcolor=#d6d6d6
| 199611 ||  || — || March 23, 2006 || Kitt Peak || Spacewatch || HYG || align=right | 6.6 km || 
|-id=612 bgcolor=#d6d6d6
| 199612 ||  || — || March 23, 2006 || Catalina || CSS || KOR || align=right | 2.1 km || 
|-id=613 bgcolor=#E9E9E9
| 199613 ||  || — || March 25, 2006 || Kitt Peak || Spacewatch || — || align=right | 2.4 km || 
|-id=614 bgcolor=#d6d6d6
| 199614 ||  || — || March 26, 2006 || Kitt Peak || Spacewatch || ANF || align=right | 2.0 km || 
|-id=615 bgcolor=#E9E9E9
| 199615 ||  || — || March 26, 2006 || Mount Lemmon || Mount Lemmon Survey || — || align=right | 3.5 km || 
|-id=616 bgcolor=#fefefe
| 199616 ||  || — || March 26, 2006 || Mount Lemmon || Mount Lemmon Survey || NYS || align=right | 1.2 km || 
|-id=617 bgcolor=#d6d6d6
| 199617 ||  || — || March 26, 2006 || Mount Lemmon || Mount Lemmon Survey || KAR || align=right | 1.8 km || 
|-id=618 bgcolor=#d6d6d6
| 199618 ||  || — || March 29, 2006 || Socorro || LINEAR || EOS || align=right | 3.5 km || 
|-id=619 bgcolor=#E9E9E9
| 199619 ||  || — || March 23, 2006 || Catalina || CSS || — || align=right | 1.1 km || 
|-id=620 bgcolor=#d6d6d6
| 199620 ||  || — || March 23, 2006 || Kitt Peak || Spacewatch || — || align=right | 4.5 km || 
|-id=621 bgcolor=#E9E9E9
| 199621 ||  || — || March 24, 2006 || Socorro || LINEAR || PAD || align=right | 4.4 km || 
|-id=622 bgcolor=#E9E9E9
| 199622 ||  || — || March 24, 2006 || Anderson Mesa || LONEOS || — || align=right | 4.3 km || 
|-id=623 bgcolor=#E9E9E9
| 199623 ||  || — || March 25, 2006 || Jarnac || Jarnac Obs. || — || align=right | 3.3 km || 
|-id=624 bgcolor=#d6d6d6
| 199624 ||  || — || March 25, 2006 || Mount Lemmon || Mount Lemmon Survey || — || align=right | 4.7 km || 
|-id=625 bgcolor=#d6d6d6
| 199625 ||  || — || March 23, 2006 || Catalina || CSS || — || align=right | 3.7 km || 
|-id=626 bgcolor=#d6d6d6
| 199626 ||  || — || March 26, 2006 || Anderson Mesa || LONEOS || — || align=right | 3.8 km || 
|-id=627 bgcolor=#E9E9E9
| 199627 ||  || — || March 25, 2006 || Kitt Peak || Spacewatch || EUN || align=right | 1.6 km || 
|-id=628 bgcolor=#d6d6d6
| 199628 ||  || — || March 23, 2006 || Kitt Peak || Spacewatch || — || align=right | 3.9 km || 
|-id=629 bgcolor=#E9E9E9
| 199629 ||  || — || March 23, 2006 || Kitt Peak || Spacewatch || AGN || align=right | 2.0 km || 
|-id=630 bgcolor=#E9E9E9
| 199630 Szitkay|| 2006 GS || — || April 2, 2006 || Piszkéstető || K. Sárneczky || WIT || align=right | 1.5 km || 
|-id=631 bgcolor=#E9E9E9
| 199631 Giuseppesprizzi || 2006 GX ||  || April 2, 2006 || Vallemare di Borbona || V. S. Casulli || AGN || align=right | 2.1 km || 
|-id=632 bgcolor=#d6d6d6
| 199632 ||  || — || April 2, 2006 || Piszkéstető || K. Sárneczky || — || align=right | 4.1 km || 
|-id=633 bgcolor=#E9E9E9
| 199633 ||  || — || April 7, 2006 || Ottmarsheim || C. Rinner || DOR || align=right | 4.4 km || 
|-id=634 bgcolor=#E9E9E9
| 199634 ||  || — || April 2, 2006 || Kitt Peak || Spacewatch || — || align=right | 1.7 km || 
|-id=635 bgcolor=#E9E9E9
| 199635 ||  || — || April 2, 2006 || Kitt Peak || Spacewatch || NEM || align=right | 3.4 km || 
|-id=636 bgcolor=#d6d6d6
| 199636 ||  || — || April 2, 2006 || Kitt Peak || Spacewatch || HYG || align=right | 5.7 km || 
|-id=637 bgcolor=#d6d6d6
| 199637 ||  || — || April 2, 2006 || Kitt Peak || Spacewatch || — || align=right | 4.7 km || 
|-id=638 bgcolor=#E9E9E9
| 199638 ||  || — || April 2, 2006 || Kitt Peak || Spacewatch || HEN || align=right | 1.6 km || 
|-id=639 bgcolor=#E9E9E9
| 199639 ||  || — || April 2, 2006 || Kitt Peak || Spacewatch || — || align=right | 4.1 km || 
|-id=640 bgcolor=#E9E9E9
| 199640 ||  || — || April 2, 2006 || Kitt Peak || Spacewatch || HNS || align=right | 1.7 km || 
|-id=641 bgcolor=#d6d6d6
| 199641 ||  || — || April 2, 2006 || Kitt Peak || Spacewatch || — || align=right | 2.9 km || 
|-id=642 bgcolor=#E9E9E9
| 199642 ||  || — || April 2, 2006 || Kitt Peak || Spacewatch || — || align=right | 3.4 km || 
|-id=643 bgcolor=#d6d6d6
| 199643 ||  || — || April 2, 2006 || Kitt Peak || Spacewatch || HYG || align=right | 3.3 km || 
|-id=644 bgcolor=#d6d6d6
| 199644 ||  || — || April 2, 2006 || Kitt Peak || Spacewatch || THM || align=right | 5.2 km || 
|-id=645 bgcolor=#d6d6d6
| 199645 ||  || — || April 2, 2006 || Kitt Peak || Spacewatch || — || align=right | 3.3 km || 
|-id=646 bgcolor=#E9E9E9
| 199646 ||  || — || April 2, 2006 || Kitt Peak || Spacewatch || — || align=right | 3.7 km || 
|-id=647 bgcolor=#d6d6d6
| 199647 ||  || — || April 2, 2006 || Mount Lemmon || Mount Lemmon Survey || — || align=right | 2.7 km || 
|-id=648 bgcolor=#d6d6d6
| 199648 ||  || — || April 2, 2006 || Kitt Peak || Spacewatch || — || align=right | 4.7 km || 
|-id=649 bgcolor=#d6d6d6
| 199649 ||  || — || April 2, 2006 || Kitt Peak || Spacewatch || EOS || align=right | 2.9 km || 
|-id=650 bgcolor=#fefefe
| 199650 ||  || — || April 2, 2006 || Mount Lemmon || Mount Lemmon Survey || — || align=right | 1.3 km || 
|-id=651 bgcolor=#d6d6d6
| 199651 ||  || — || April 6, 2006 || Bergisch Gladbach || W. Bickel || — || align=right | 5.0 km || 
|-id=652 bgcolor=#d6d6d6
| 199652 ||  || — || April 7, 2006 || Mount Lemmon || Mount Lemmon Survey || — || align=right | 3.9 km || 
|-id=653 bgcolor=#d6d6d6
| 199653 ||  || — || April 8, 2006 || Mount Lemmon || Mount Lemmon Survey || KOR || align=right | 1.9 km || 
|-id=654 bgcolor=#d6d6d6
| 199654 ||  || — || April 2, 2006 || Anderson Mesa || LONEOS || EUP || align=right | 7.2 km || 
|-id=655 bgcolor=#E9E9E9
| 199655 ||  || — || April 12, 2006 || Palomar || NEAT || — || align=right | 2.0 km || 
|-id=656 bgcolor=#d6d6d6
| 199656 ||  || — || April 8, 2006 || Siding Spring || SSS || — || align=right | 4.7 km || 
|-id=657 bgcolor=#d6d6d6
| 199657 ||  || — || April 7, 2006 || Catalina || CSS || — || align=right | 5.3 km || 
|-id=658 bgcolor=#E9E9E9
| 199658 ||  || — || April 2, 2006 || Kitt Peak || Spacewatch || — || align=right | 1.1 km || 
|-id=659 bgcolor=#E9E9E9
| 199659 ||  || — || April 2, 2006 || Kitt Peak || Spacewatch || — || align=right | 1.8 km || 
|-id=660 bgcolor=#fefefe
| 199660 ||  || — || April 8, 2006 || Mount Lemmon || Mount Lemmon Survey || V || align=right | 1.3 km || 
|-id=661 bgcolor=#E9E9E9
| 199661 ||  || — || April 9, 2006 || Kitt Peak || Spacewatch || — || align=right | 3.1 km || 
|-id=662 bgcolor=#d6d6d6
| 199662 ||  || — || April 9, 2006 || Kitt Peak || Spacewatch || — || align=right | 5.3 km || 
|-id=663 bgcolor=#d6d6d6
| 199663 ||  || — || April 9, 2006 || Kitt Peak || Spacewatch || EOS || align=right | 2.7 km || 
|-id=664 bgcolor=#E9E9E9
| 199664 ||  || — || April 9, 2006 || Kitt Peak || Spacewatch || — || align=right | 3.4 km || 
|-id=665 bgcolor=#E9E9E9
| 199665 ||  || — || April 9, 2006 || Kitt Peak || Spacewatch || EUN || align=right | 2.1 km || 
|-id=666 bgcolor=#d6d6d6
| 199666 ||  || — || April 9, 2006 || Kitt Peak || Spacewatch || HYG || align=right | 4.9 km || 
|-id=667 bgcolor=#E9E9E9
| 199667 ||  || — || April 8, 2006 || Siding Spring || SSS || — || align=right | 3.8 km || 
|-id=668 bgcolor=#E9E9E9
| 199668 ||  || — || April 9, 2006 || Catalina || CSS || — || align=right | 2.2 km || 
|-id=669 bgcolor=#d6d6d6
| 199669 ||  || — || April 7, 2006 || Catalina || CSS || EOS || align=right | 3.3 km || 
|-id=670 bgcolor=#E9E9E9
| 199670 ||  || — || April 2, 2006 || Kitt Peak || Spacewatch || XIZ || align=right | 2.3 km || 
|-id=671 bgcolor=#E9E9E9
| 199671 || 2006 HV || — || April 18, 2006 || Kitt Peak || Spacewatch || — || align=right | 1.8 km || 
|-id=672 bgcolor=#d6d6d6
| 199672 ||  || — || April 18, 2006 || Kitt Peak || Spacewatch || THM || align=right | 3.6 km || 
|-id=673 bgcolor=#E9E9E9
| 199673 ||  || — || April 18, 2006 || Kitt Peak || Spacewatch || — || align=right | 4.5 km || 
|-id=674 bgcolor=#E9E9E9
| 199674 ||  || — || April 18, 2006 || Kitt Peak || Spacewatch || — || align=right | 4.4 km || 
|-id=675 bgcolor=#E9E9E9
| 199675 ||  || — || April 19, 2006 || Mount Lemmon || Mount Lemmon Survey || — || align=right | 1.9 km || 
|-id=676 bgcolor=#E9E9E9
| 199676 ||  || — || April 19, 2006 || Palomar || NEAT || — || align=right | 2.9 km || 
|-id=677 bgcolor=#d6d6d6
| 199677 Terzani ||  ||  || April 20, 2006 || Vallemare di Borbona || V. S. Casulli || — || align=right | 4.6 km || 
|-id=678 bgcolor=#d6d6d6
| 199678 ||  || — || April 18, 2006 || Kitt Peak || Spacewatch || — || align=right | 6.3 km || 
|-id=679 bgcolor=#E9E9E9
| 199679 ||  || — || April 19, 2006 || Kitt Peak || Spacewatch || — || align=right | 3.4 km || 
|-id=680 bgcolor=#E9E9E9
| 199680 ||  || — || April 19, 2006 || Kitt Peak || Spacewatch || — || align=right | 3.4 km || 
|-id=681 bgcolor=#d6d6d6
| 199681 ||  || — || April 19, 2006 || Mount Lemmon || Mount Lemmon Survey || K-2 || align=right | 2.0 km || 
|-id=682 bgcolor=#d6d6d6
| 199682 ||  || — || April 19, 2006 || Palomar || NEAT || — || align=right | 4.7 km || 
|-id=683 bgcolor=#E9E9E9
| 199683 ||  || — || April 19, 2006 || Palomar || NEAT || — || align=right | 3.0 km || 
|-id=684 bgcolor=#d6d6d6
| 199684 ||  || — || April 20, 2006 || Junk Bond || D. Healy || — || align=right | 3.3 km || 
|-id=685 bgcolor=#E9E9E9
| 199685 ||  || — || April 19, 2006 || Palomar || NEAT || — || align=right | 2.2 km || 
|-id=686 bgcolor=#d6d6d6
| 199686 ||  || — || April 21, 2006 || RAS || A. Lowe || — || align=right | 5.2 km || 
|-id=687 bgcolor=#d6d6d6
| 199687 Erősszsolt ||  ||  || April 21, 2006 || Piszkéstető || K. Sárneczky || THM || align=right | 3.1 km || 
|-id=688 bgcolor=#d6d6d6
| 199688 Kisspéter ||  ||  || April 21, 2006 || Piszkéstető || K. Sárneczky || — || align=right | 3.3 km || 
|-id=689 bgcolor=#E9E9E9
| 199689 ||  || — || April 20, 2006 || Kitt Peak || Spacewatch || — || align=right | 3.0 km || 
|-id=690 bgcolor=#E9E9E9
| 199690 ||  || — || April 20, 2006 || Kitt Peak || Spacewatch || AGN || align=right | 1.4 km || 
|-id=691 bgcolor=#E9E9E9
| 199691 ||  || — || April 20, 2006 || Kitt Peak || Spacewatch || JUN || align=right | 1.4 km || 
|-id=692 bgcolor=#d6d6d6
| 199692 ||  || — || April 20, 2006 || Kitt Peak || Spacewatch || — || align=right | 3.6 km || 
|-id=693 bgcolor=#d6d6d6
| 199693 ||  || — || April 20, 2006 || Kitt Peak || Spacewatch || — || align=right | 3.6 km || 
|-id=694 bgcolor=#E9E9E9
| 199694 ||  || — || April 20, 2006 || Kitt Peak || Spacewatch || — || align=right | 3.4 km || 
|-id=695 bgcolor=#E9E9E9
| 199695 ||  || — || April 19, 2006 || Catalina || CSS || — || align=right | 1.5 km || 
|-id=696 bgcolor=#d6d6d6
| 199696 Kemenesi ||  ||  || April 25, 2006 || Piszkéstető || K. Sárneczky || — || align=right | 5.5 km || 
|-id=697 bgcolor=#d6d6d6
| 199697 ||  || — || April 19, 2006 || Palomar || NEAT || — || align=right | 5.0 km || 
|-id=698 bgcolor=#d6d6d6
| 199698 ||  || — || April 19, 2006 || Mount Lemmon || Mount Lemmon Survey || THM || align=right | 3.6 km || 
|-id=699 bgcolor=#d6d6d6
| 199699 ||  || — || April 21, 2006 || Kitt Peak || Spacewatch || EOS || align=right | 2.8 km || 
|-id=700 bgcolor=#d6d6d6
| 199700 ||  || — || April 21, 2006 || Kitt Peak || Spacewatch || 7:4 || align=right | 3.7 km || 
|}

199701–199800 

|-bgcolor=#E9E9E9
| 199701 ||  || — || April 21, 2006 || Kitt Peak || Spacewatch || JUN || align=right | 1.3 km || 
|-id=702 bgcolor=#d6d6d6
| 199702 ||  || — || April 21, 2006 || Kitt Peak || Spacewatch || — || align=right | 6.4 km || 
|-id=703 bgcolor=#d6d6d6
| 199703 ||  || — || April 24, 2006 || Anderson Mesa || LONEOS || — || align=right | 3.6 km || 
|-id=704 bgcolor=#d6d6d6
| 199704 ||  || — || April 24, 2006 || Mount Lemmon || Mount Lemmon Survey || — || align=right | 3.7 km || 
|-id=705 bgcolor=#d6d6d6
| 199705 ||  || — || April 25, 2006 || Kitt Peak || Spacewatch || THM || align=right | 3.8 km || 
|-id=706 bgcolor=#d6d6d6
| 199706 ||  || — || April 25, 2006 || Kitt Peak || Spacewatch || — || align=right | 3.6 km || 
|-id=707 bgcolor=#d6d6d6
| 199707 ||  || — || April 20, 2006 || Kitt Peak || Spacewatch || — || align=right | 3.6 km || 
|-id=708 bgcolor=#E9E9E9
| 199708 ||  || — || April 25, 2006 || Kitt Peak || Spacewatch || — || align=right | 3.3 km || 
|-id=709 bgcolor=#d6d6d6
| 199709 ||  || — || April 19, 2006 || Palomar || NEAT || — || align=right | 6.3 km || 
|-id=710 bgcolor=#E9E9E9
| 199710 ||  || — || April 30, 2006 || Kanab || E. E. Sheridan || — || align=right | 2.7 km || 
|-id=711 bgcolor=#E9E9E9
| 199711 ||  || — || April 24, 2006 || Socorro || LINEAR || — || align=right | 3.4 km || 
|-id=712 bgcolor=#d6d6d6
| 199712 ||  || — || April 28, 2006 || Socorro || LINEAR || — || align=right | 5.2 km || 
|-id=713 bgcolor=#d6d6d6
| 199713 ||  || — || April 24, 2006 || Kitt Peak || Spacewatch || — || align=right | 4.3 km || 
|-id=714 bgcolor=#d6d6d6
| 199714 ||  || — || April 24, 2006 || Mount Lemmon || Mount Lemmon Survey || URS || align=right | 4.4 km || 
|-id=715 bgcolor=#d6d6d6
| 199715 ||  || — || April 26, 2006 || Kitt Peak || Spacewatch || 3:2 || align=right | 5.9 km || 
|-id=716 bgcolor=#E9E9E9
| 199716 ||  || — || April 26, 2006 || Kitt Peak || Spacewatch || — || align=right | 2.5 km || 
|-id=717 bgcolor=#d6d6d6
| 199717 ||  || — || April 26, 2006 || Kitt Peak || Spacewatch || EOS || align=right | 2.4 km || 
|-id=718 bgcolor=#d6d6d6
| 199718 ||  || — || April 26, 2006 || Kitt Peak || Spacewatch || HYG || align=right | 5.4 km || 
|-id=719 bgcolor=#d6d6d6
| 199719 ||  || — || April 26, 2006 || Kitt Peak || Spacewatch || — || align=right | 5.4 km || 
|-id=720 bgcolor=#d6d6d6
| 199720 ||  || — || April 26, 2006 || Kitt Peak || Spacewatch || URS || align=right | 5.3 km || 
|-id=721 bgcolor=#d6d6d6
| 199721 ||  || — || April 26, 2006 || Kitt Peak || Spacewatch || URS || align=right | 5.8 km || 
|-id=722 bgcolor=#E9E9E9
| 199722 ||  || — || April 27, 2006 || Kitt Peak || Spacewatch || HEN || align=right | 2.5 km || 
|-id=723 bgcolor=#E9E9E9
| 199723 ||  || — || April 27, 2006 || Socorro || LINEAR || — || align=right | 1.7 km || 
|-id=724 bgcolor=#d6d6d6
| 199724 ||  || — || April 30, 2006 || Kitt Peak || Spacewatch || — || align=right | 4.6 km || 
|-id=725 bgcolor=#E9E9E9
| 199725 ||  || — || April 30, 2006 || Kitt Peak || Spacewatch || — || align=right | 2.7 km || 
|-id=726 bgcolor=#E9E9E9
| 199726 ||  || — || April 30, 2006 || Kitt Peak || Spacewatch || GEF || align=right | 2.1 km || 
|-id=727 bgcolor=#E9E9E9
| 199727 ||  || — || April 30, 2006 || Kitt Peak || Spacewatch || — || align=right | 2.8 km || 
|-id=728 bgcolor=#E9E9E9
| 199728 ||  || — || April 30, 2006 || Kitt Peak || Spacewatch || — || align=right | 2.4 km || 
|-id=729 bgcolor=#d6d6d6
| 199729 ||  || — || April 30, 2006 || Kitt Peak || Spacewatch || EOS || align=right | 3.1 km || 
|-id=730 bgcolor=#d6d6d6
| 199730 ||  || — || April 19, 2006 || Catalina || CSS || EOS || align=right | 2.9 km || 
|-id=731 bgcolor=#d6d6d6
| 199731 ||  || — || April 30, 2006 || Kitt Peak || Spacewatch || — || align=right | 3.9 km || 
|-id=732 bgcolor=#E9E9E9
| 199732 ||  || — || April 30, 2006 || Catalina || CSS || ADE || align=right | 4.4 km || 
|-id=733 bgcolor=#E9E9E9
| 199733 ||  || — || April 21, 2006 || Palomar || NEAT || MAR || align=right | 2.0 km || 
|-id=734 bgcolor=#d6d6d6
| 199734 ||  || — || April 26, 2006 || Siding Spring || SSS || ALA || align=right | 8.1 km || 
|-id=735 bgcolor=#d6d6d6
| 199735 ||  || — || April 24, 2006 || Anderson Mesa || LONEOS || — || align=right | 4.5 km || 
|-id=736 bgcolor=#E9E9E9
| 199736 ||  || — || April 30, 2006 || Catalina || CSS || MIT || align=right | 3.2 km || 
|-id=737 bgcolor=#d6d6d6
| 199737 ||  || — || April 25, 2006 || Mount Lemmon || Mount Lemmon Survey || — || align=right | 3.1 km || 
|-id=738 bgcolor=#E9E9E9
| 199738 ||  || — || April 26, 2006 || Kitt Peak || Spacewatch || AST || align=right | 2.2 km || 
|-id=739 bgcolor=#E9E9E9
| 199739 ||  || — || April 24, 2006 || Kitt Peak || Spacewatch || — || align=right | 1.9 km || 
|-id=740 bgcolor=#E9E9E9
| 199740 ||  || — || April 19, 2006 || Mount Lemmon || Mount Lemmon Survey || AGN || align=right | 1.6 km || 
|-id=741 bgcolor=#d6d6d6
| 199741 Weidner ||  ||  || April 26, 2006 || Cerro Tololo || M. W. Buie || — || align=right | 3.0 km || 
|-id=742 bgcolor=#d6d6d6
| 199742 || 2006 JD || — || May 1, 2006 || Wrightwood || J. W. Young || EOS || align=right | 3.2 km || 
|-id=743 bgcolor=#d6d6d6
| 199743 ||  || — || May 2, 2006 || Mount Lemmon || Mount Lemmon Survey || URS || align=right | 5.5 km || 
|-id=744 bgcolor=#d6d6d6
| 199744 ||  || — || May 1, 2006 || Kitt Peak || Spacewatch || — || align=right | 3.6 km || 
|-id=745 bgcolor=#d6d6d6
| 199745 ||  || — || May 1, 2006 || Kitt Peak || Spacewatch || — || align=right | 5.9 km || 
|-id=746 bgcolor=#d6d6d6
| 199746 ||  || — || May 1, 2006 || Kitt Peak || Spacewatch || TEL || align=right | 3.4 km || 
|-id=747 bgcolor=#E9E9E9
| 199747 ||  || — || May 3, 2006 || Kitt Peak || Spacewatch || GEF || align=right | 1.8 km || 
|-id=748 bgcolor=#d6d6d6
| 199748 ||  || — || May 4, 2006 || Mount Lemmon || Mount Lemmon Survey || — || align=right | 4.1 km || 
|-id=749 bgcolor=#E9E9E9
| 199749 ||  || — || May 4, 2006 || Mount Lemmon || Mount Lemmon Survey || MRX || align=right | 1.4 km || 
|-id=750 bgcolor=#E9E9E9
| 199750 ||  || — || May 5, 2006 || Mount Lemmon || Mount Lemmon Survey || — || align=right | 2.6 km || 
|-id=751 bgcolor=#E9E9E9
| 199751 ||  || — || May 1, 2006 || Socorro || LINEAR || — || align=right | 2.7 km || 
|-id=752 bgcolor=#d6d6d6
| 199752 ||  || — || May 3, 2006 || Kitt Peak || Spacewatch || — || align=right | 3.6 km || 
|-id=753 bgcolor=#E9E9E9
| 199753 ||  || — || May 4, 2006 || Kitt Peak || Spacewatch || RAF || align=right | 1.7 km || 
|-id=754 bgcolor=#E9E9E9
| 199754 ||  || — || May 6, 2006 || Mount Lemmon || Mount Lemmon Survey || — || align=right | 4.5 km || 
|-id=755 bgcolor=#d6d6d6
| 199755 ||  || — || May 6, 2006 || Mount Lemmon || Mount Lemmon Survey || KOR || align=right | 2.2 km || 
|-id=756 bgcolor=#E9E9E9
| 199756 ||  || — || May 7, 2006 || Kitt Peak || Spacewatch || XIZ || align=right | 1.7 km || 
|-id=757 bgcolor=#d6d6d6
| 199757 ||  || — || May 7, 2006 || Mount Lemmon || Mount Lemmon Survey || — || align=right | 6.3 km || 
|-id=758 bgcolor=#d6d6d6
| 199758 ||  || — || May 1, 2006 || Socorro || LINEAR || — || align=right | 4.3 km || 
|-id=759 bgcolor=#E9E9E9
| 199759 ||  || — || May 5, 2006 || Anderson Mesa || LONEOS || — || align=right | 1.6 km || 
|-id=760 bgcolor=#d6d6d6
| 199760 ||  || — || May 2, 2006 || Mount Lemmon || Mount Lemmon Survey || EOS || align=right | 2.6 km || 
|-id=761 bgcolor=#d6d6d6
| 199761 ||  || — || May 2, 2006 || Mount Lemmon || Mount Lemmon Survey || — || align=right | 4.1 km || 
|-id=762 bgcolor=#d6d6d6
| 199762 ||  || — || May 1, 2006 || Socorro || LINEAR || — || align=right | 5.7 km || 
|-id=763 bgcolor=#d6d6d6
| 199763 Davidgregory ||  ||  || May 1, 2006 || Mauna Kea || P. A. Wiegert || — || align=right | 3.3 km || 
|-id=764 bgcolor=#d6d6d6
| 199764 ||  || — || May 20, 2006 || Reedy Creek || J. Broughton || — || align=right | 5.0 km || 
|-id=765 bgcolor=#E9E9E9
| 199765 ||  || — || May 19, 2006 || Mount Lemmon || Mount Lemmon Survey || — || align=right | 1.3 km || 
|-id=766 bgcolor=#d6d6d6
| 199766 ||  || — || May 19, 2006 || Mount Lemmon || Mount Lemmon Survey || — || align=right | 4.4 km || 
|-id=767 bgcolor=#E9E9E9
| 199767 ||  || — || May 20, 2006 || Kitt Peak || Spacewatch || — || align=right | 2.7 km || 
|-id=768 bgcolor=#E9E9E9
| 199768 ||  || — || May 21, 2006 || Mount Lemmon || Mount Lemmon Survey || AST || align=right | 3.1 km || 
|-id=769 bgcolor=#d6d6d6
| 199769 ||  || — || May 19, 2006 || Catalina || CSS || — || align=right | 4.5 km || 
|-id=770 bgcolor=#d6d6d6
| 199770 ||  || — || May 20, 2006 || Anderson Mesa || LONEOS || — || align=right | 5.5 km || 
|-id=771 bgcolor=#d6d6d6
| 199771 ||  || — || May 16, 2006 || Siding Spring || SSS || — || align=right | 5.0 km || 
|-id=772 bgcolor=#d6d6d6
| 199772 ||  || — || May 19, 2006 || Anderson Mesa || LONEOS || — || align=right | 4.8 km || 
|-id=773 bgcolor=#d6d6d6
| 199773 ||  || — || May 20, 2006 || Kitt Peak || Spacewatch || — || align=right | 3.5 km || 
|-id=774 bgcolor=#d6d6d6
| 199774 ||  || — || May 20, 2006 || Kitt Peak || Spacewatch || THM || align=right | 3.4 km || 
|-id=775 bgcolor=#d6d6d6
| 199775 ||  || — || May 20, 2006 || Kitt Peak || Spacewatch || KOR || align=right | 1.6 km || 
|-id=776 bgcolor=#d6d6d6
| 199776 ||  || — || May 20, 2006 || Kitt Peak || Spacewatch || — || align=right | 7.1 km || 
|-id=777 bgcolor=#E9E9E9
| 199777 ||  || — || May 21, 2006 || Kitt Peak || Spacewatch || AGN || align=right | 1.5 km || 
|-id=778 bgcolor=#d6d6d6
| 199778 ||  || — || May 22, 2006 || Kitt Peak || Spacewatch || — || align=right | 4.8 km || 
|-id=779 bgcolor=#d6d6d6
| 199779 ||  || — || May 23, 2006 || Kitt Peak || Spacewatch || — || align=right | 3.8 km || 
|-id=780 bgcolor=#d6d6d6
| 199780 ||  || — || May 24, 2006 || Palomar || NEAT || — || align=right | 3.2 km || 
|-id=781 bgcolor=#d6d6d6
| 199781 ||  || — || May 25, 2006 || Mount Lemmon || Mount Lemmon Survey || — || align=right | 4.8 km || 
|-id=782 bgcolor=#E9E9E9
| 199782 ||  || — || May 22, 2006 || Siding Spring || SSS || — || align=right | 2.0 km || 
|-id=783 bgcolor=#d6d6d6
| 199783 ||  || — || May 26, 2006 || Kitt Peak || Spacewatch || — || align=right | 5.2 km || 
|-id=784 bgcolor=#d6d6d6
| 199784 ||  || — || May 30, 2006 || Mount Lemmon || Mount Lemmon Survey || — || align=right | 3.4 km || 
|-id=785 bgcolor=#d6d6d6
| 199785 ||  || — || May 31, 2006 || Mount Lemmon || Mount Lemmon Survey || — || align=right | 3.8 km || 
|-id=786 bgcolor=#d6d6d6
| 199786 ||  || — || May 29, 2006 || Kitt Peak || Spacewatch || EOS || align=right | 2.9 km || 
|-id=787 bgcolor=#E9E9E9
| 199787 ||  || — || June 15, 2006 || Kitt Peak || Spacewatch || — || align=right | 3.9 km || 
|-id=788 bgcolor=#d6d6d6
| 199788 ||  || — || June 15, 2006 || Kitt Peak || Spacewatch || VER || align=right | 5.3 km || 
|-id=789 bgcolor=#E9E9E9
| 199789 ||  || — || June 17, 2006 || Kitt Peak || Spacewatch || — || align=right | 3.9 km || 
|-id=790 bgcolor=#d6d6d6
| 199790 ||  || — || June 18, 2006 || Kitt Peak || Spacewatch || — || align=right | 4.7 km || 
|-id=791 bgcolor=#C2FFFF
| 199791 ||  || — || June 19, 2006 || Kitt Peak || Spacewatch || L4 || align=right | 15 km || 
|-id=792 bgcolor=#C2FFFF
| 199792 ||  || — || August 6, 2006 || Lulin Observatory || C.-S. Lin, Q.-z. Ye || L4 || align=right | 16 km || 
|-id=793 bgcolor=#C2FFFF
| 199793 ||  || — || August 15, 2006 || Palomar || NEAT || L4 || align=right | 15 km || 
|-id=794 bgcolor=#d6d6d6
| 199794 ||  || — || August 28, 2006 || Catalina || CSS || — || align=right | 4.8 km || 
|-id=795 bgcolor=#d6d6d6
| 199795 ||  || — || October 20, 2006 || Kitt Peak || Spacewatch || — || align=right | 2.8 km || 
|-id=796 bgcolor=#C2FFFF
| 199796 ||  || — || October 28, 2006 || Mount Lemmon || Mount Lemmon Survey || L4 || align=right | 11 km || 
|-id=797 bgcolor=#E9E9E9
| 199797 ||  || — || October 23, 2006 || Mount Lemmon || Mount Lemmon Survey || — || align=right | 1.9 km || 
|-id=798 bgcolor=#FA8072
| 199798 ||  || — || October 27, 2006 || Mount Lemmon || Mount Lemmon Survey || H || align=right | 1.2 km || 
|-id=799 bgcolor=#fefefe
| 199799 ||  || — || November 22, 2006 || Mount Lemmon || Mount Lemmon Survey || — || align=right | 1.1 km || 
|-id=800 bgcolor=#fefefe
| 199800 ||  || — || December 21, 2006 || Palomar || NEAT || H || align=right | 1.2 km || 
|}

199801–199900 

|-bgcolor=#FFC2E0
| 199801 ||  || — || January 10, 2007 || Mount Lemmon || Mount Lemmon Survey || APOPHA || align=right data-sort-value="0.50" | 500 m || 
|-id=802 bgcolor=#fefefe
| 199802 ||  || — || January 17, 2007 || Kitt Peak || Spacewatch || — || align=right | 1.2 km || 
|-id=803 bgcolor=#fefefe
| 199803 ||  || — || January 27, 2007 || Mount Lemmon || Mount Lemmon Survey || MAS || align=right | 1.1 km || 
|-id=804 bgcolor=#E9E9E9
| 199804 ||  || — || January 27, 2007 || Mount Lemmon || Mount Lemmon Survey || — || align=right | 1.6 km || 
|-id=805 bgcolor=#E9E9E9
| 199805 ||  || — || January 27, 2007 || Mount Lemmon || Mount Lemmon Survey || EUN || align=right | 1.8 km || 
|-id=806 bgcolor=#fefefe
| 199806 || 2007 CA || — || February 5, 2007 || Palomar || NEAT || H || align=right | 1.1 km || 
|-id=807 bgcolor=#fefefe
| 199807 ||  || — || February 9, 2007 || Kitt Peak || Spacewatch || — || align=right | 1.2 km || 
|-id=808 bgcolor=#fefefe
| 199808 ||  || — || February 15, 2007 || Palomar || NEAT || NYS || align=right | 1.2 km || 
|-id=809 bgcolor=#fefefe
| 199809 ||  || — || February 14, 2007 || Črni Vrh || Črni Vrh || H || align=right | 1.2 km || 
|-id=810 bgcolor=#d6d6d6
| 199810 ||  || — || February 21, 2007 || Catalina || CSS || EUP || align=right | 8.6 km || 
|-id=811 bgcolor=#fefefe
| 199811 ||  || — || February 16, 2007 || Palomar || NEAT || NYS || align=right | 1.1 km || 
|-id=812 bgcolor=#fefefe
| 199812 ||  || — || February 17, 2007 || Kitt Peak || Spacewatch || — || align=right data-sort-value="0.99" | 990 m || 
|-id=813 bgcolor=#fefefe
| 199813 ||  || — || February 17, 2007 || Kitt Peak || Spacewatch || — || align=right data-sort-value="0.73" | 730 m || 
|-id=814 bgcolor=#fefefe
| 199814 ||  || — || February 17, 2007 || Kitt Peak || Spacewatch || MAS || align=right | 1.1 km || 
|-id=815 bgcolor=#fefefe
| 199815 ||  || — || February 17, 2007 || Kitt Peak || Spacewatch || MAS || align=right data-sort-value="0.94" | 940 m || 
|-id=816 bgcolor=#fefefe
| 199816 ||  || — || February 17, 2007 || Kitt Peak || Spacewatch || — || align=right data-sort-value="0.87" | 870 m || 
|-id=817 bgcolor=#FA8072
| 199817 ||  || — || February 16, 2007 || Catalina || CSS || H || align=right data-sort-value="0.99" | 990 m || 
|-id=818 bgcolor=#fefefe
| 199818 ||  || — || February 19, 2007 || Mount Lemmon || Mount Lemmon Survey || — || align=right | 1.0 km || 
|-id=819 bgcolor=#fefefe
| 199819 ||  || — || February 19, 2007 || Mount Lemmon || Mount Lemmon Survey || NYS || align=right data-sort-value="0.96" | 960 m || 
|-id=820 bgcolor=#fefefe
| 199820 ||  || — || February 21, 2007 || Kitt Peak || Spacewatch || — || align=right | 1.1 km || 
|-id=821 bgcolor=#d6d6d6
| 199821 ||  || — || February 23, 2007 || Catalina || CSS || — || align=right | 8.2 km || 
|-id=822 bgcolor=#fefefe
| 199822 ||  || — || February 21, 2007 || Socorro || LINEAR || — || align=right | 1.1 km || 
|-id=823 bgcolor=#E9E9E9
| 199823 ||  || — || February 23, 2007 || Kitt Peak || Spacewatch || — || align=right | 1.4 km || 
|-id=824 bgcolor=#fefefe
| 199824 ||  || — || February 23, 2007 || Kitt Peak || Spacewatch || — || align=right data-sort-value="0.94" | 940 m || 
|-id=825 bgcolor=#fefefe
| 199825 ||  || — || February 23, 2007 || Kitt Peak || Spacewatch || — || align=right data-sort-value="0.73" | 730 m || 
|-id=826 bgcolor=#fefefe
| 199826 ||  || — || February 23, 2007 || Mount Lemmon || Mount Lemmon Survey || — || align=right data-sort-value="0.90" | 900 m || 
|-id=827 bgcolor=#fefefe
| 199827 ||  || — || February 23, 2007 || Mount Lemmon || Mount Lemmon Survey || FLO || align=right data-sort-value="0.48" | 480 m || 
|-id=828 bgcolor=#fefefe
| 199828 ||  || — || February 27, 2007 || Kitt Peak || Spacewatch || — || align=right | 1.2 km || 
|-id=829 bgcolor=#E9E9E9
| 199829 ||  || — || February 25, 2007 || Mount Lemmon || Mount Lemmon Survey || — || align=right | 1.7 km || 
|-id=830 bgcolor=#fefefe
| 199830 ||  || — || March 9, 2007 || Palomar || NEAT || — || align=right | 1.2 km || 
|-id=831 bgcolor=#fefefe
| 199831 ||  || — || March 9, 2007 || Mount Lemmon || Mount Lemmon Survey || FLO || align=right data-sort-value="0.62" | 620 m || 
|-id=832 bgcolor=#fefefe
| 199832 ||  || — || March 10, 2007 || Kitt Peak || Spacewatch || NYS || align=right data-sort-value="0.83" | 830 m || 
|-id=833 bgcolor=#E9E9E9
| 199833 ||  || — || March 10, 2007 || Mount Lemmon || Mount Lemmon Survey || HNA || align=right | 4.4 km || 
|-id=834 bgcolor=#fefefe
| 199834 ||  || — || March 10, 2007 || Mount Lemmon || Mount Lemmon Survey || — || align=right | 2.0 km || 
|-id=835 bgcolor=#fefefe
| 199835 ||  || — || March 10, 2007 || Mount Lemmon || Mount Lemmon Survey || MAS || align=right data-sort-value="0.95" | 950 m || 
|-id=836 bgcolor=#fefefe
| 199836 ||  || — || March 12, 2007 || Altschwendt || W. Ries || — || align=right data-sort-value="0.94" | 940 m || 
|-id=837 bgcolor=#fefefe
| 199837 ||  || — || March 9, 2007 || Kitt Peak || Spacewatch || — || align=right data-sort-value="0.95" | 950 m || 
|-id=838 bgcolor=#E9E9E9
| 199838 Hafili ||  ||  || March 11, 2007 || Vicques || M. Ory || — || align=right | 3.7 km || 
|-id=839 bgcolor=#fefefe
| 199839 ||  || — || March 9, 2007 || Kitt Peak || Spacewatch || — || align=right data-sort-value="0.87" | 870 m || 
|-id=840 bgcolor=#fefefe
| 199840 ||  || — || March 9, 2007 || Kitt Peak || Spacewatch || NYS || align=right data-sort-value="0.80" | 800 m || 
|-id=841 bgcolor=#fefefe
| 199841 ||  || — || March 9, 2007 || Kitt Peak || Spacewatch || NYS || align=right data-sort-value="0.96" | 960 m || 
|-id=842 bgcolor=#fefefe
| 199842 ||  || — || March 9, 2007 || Kitt Peak || Spacewatch || FLO || align=right data-sort-value="0.77" | 770 m || 
|-id=843 bgcolor=#E9E9E9
| 199843 ||  || — || March 11, 2007 || Mount Lemmon || Mount Lemmon Survey || — || align=right | 3.0 km || 
|-id=844 bgcolor=#fefefe
| 199844 ||  || — || March 10, 2007 || Kitt Peak || Spacewatch || — || align=right data-sort-value="0.94" | 940 m || 
|-id=845 bgcolor=#fefefe
| 199845 ||  || — || March 10, 2007 || Kitt Peak || Spacewatch || — || align=right | 1.2 km || 
|-id=846 bgcolor=#fefefe
| 199846 ||  || — || March 10, 2007 || Kitt Peak || Spacewatch || — || align=right | 1.3 km || 
|-id=847 bgcolor=#fefefe
| 199847 ||  || — || March 10, 2007 || Kitt Peak || Spacewatch || V || align=right | 1.1 km || 
|-id=848 bgcolor=#E9E9E9
| 199848 ||  || — || March 10, 2007 || Kitt Peak || Spacewatch || — || align=right | 3.4 km || 
|-id=849 bgcolor=#fefefe
| 199849 ||  || — || March 10, 2007 || Kitt Peak || Spacewatch || MAS || align=right data-sort-value="0.95" | 950 m || 
|-id=850 bgcolor=#fefefe
| 199850 ||  || — || March 10, 2007 || Kitt Peak || Spacewatch || NYS || align=right | 1.1 km || 
|-id=851 bgcolor=#E9E9E9
| 199851 ||  || — || March 10, 2007 || Kitt Peak || Spacewatch || — || align=right | 1.9 km || 
|-id=852 bgcolor=#E9E9E9
| 199852 ||  || — || March 10, 2007 || Palomar || NEAT || GER || align=right | 2.2 km || 
|-id=853 bgcolor=#fefefe
| 199853 ||  || — || March 12, 2007 || Kitt Peak || Spacewatch || — || align=right | 1.0 km || 
|-id=854 bgcolor=#E9E9E9
| 199854 ||  || — || March 13, 2007 || Kitt Peak || Spacewatch || — || align=right | 2.8 km || 
|-id=855 bgcolor=#fefefe
| 199855 ||  || — || March 13, 2007 || Mount Lemmon || Mount Lemmon Survey || H || align=right | 1.0 km || 
|-id=856 bgcolor=#fefefe
| 199856 ||  || — || March 10, 2007 || Kitt Peak || Spacewatch || MAS || align=right | 1.1 km || 
|-id=857 bgcolor=#E9E9E9
| 199857 ||  || — || March 10, 2007 || Mount Lemmon || Mount Lemmon Survey || JNS || align=right | 3.9 km || 
|-id=858 bgcolor=#fefefe
| 199858 ||  || — || March 11, 2007 || Catalina || CSS || H || align=right | 1.1 km || 
|-id=859 bgcolor=#fefefe
| 199859 ||  || — || March 11, 2007 || Kitt Peak || Spacewatch || CLA || align=right | 2.5 km || 
|-id=860 bgcolor=#fefefe
| 199860 ||  || — || March 12, 2007 || Kitt Peak || Spacewatch || — || align=right | 1.2 km || 
|-id=861 bgcolor=#E9E9E9
| 199861 ||  || — || March 13, 2007 || Mount Lemmon || Mount Lemmon Survey || NEM || align=right | 2.9 km || 
|-id=862 bgcolor=#E9E9E9
| 199862 ||  || — || March 13, 2007 || Mount Lemmon || Mount Lemmon Survey || — || align=right | 2.0 km || 
|-id=863 bgcolor=#E9E9E9
| 199863 ||  || — || March 13, 2007 || Mount Lemmon || Mount Lemmon Survey || — || align=right | 1.6 km || 
|-id=864 bgcolor=#fefefe
| 199864 ||  || — || March 13, 2007 || Mount Lemmon || Mount Lemmon Survey || V || align=right | 1.1 km || 
|-id=865 bgcolor=#fefefe
| 199865 ||  || — || March 9, 2007 || Mount Lemmon || Mount Lemmon Survey || FLO || align=right data-sort-value="0.81" | 810 m || 
|-id=866 bgcolor=#fefefe
| 199866 ||  || — || March 10, 2007 || Mount Lemmon || Mount Lemmon Survey || — || align=right data-sort-value="0.76" | 760 m || 
|-id=867 bgcolor=#fefefe
| 199867 ||  || — || March 12, 2007 || Kitt Peak || Spacewatch || FLO || align=right data-sort-value="0.70" | 700 m || 
|-id=868 bgcolor=#fefefe
| 199868 ||  || — || March 12, 2007 || Mount Lemmon || Mount Lemmon Survey || — || align=right data-sort-value="0.98" | 980 m || 
|-id=869 bgcolor=#fefefe
| 199869 ||  || — || March 15, 2007 || Kitt Peak || Spacewatch || V || align=right data-sort-value="0.98" | 980 m || 
|-id=870 bgcolor=#fefefe
| 199870 ||  || — || March 15, 2007 || Mount Lemmon || Mount Lemmon Survey || H || align=right data-sort-value="0.97" | 970 m || 
|-id=871 bgcolor=#fefefe
| 199871 ||  || — || March 10, 2007 || Mount Lemmon || Mount Lemmon Survey || NYS || align=right data-sort-value="0.91" | 910 m || 
|-id=872 bgcolor=#E9E9E9
| 199872 ||  || — || March 13, 2007 || Kitt Peak || Spacewatch || — || align=right | 2.7 km || 
|-id=873 bgcolor=#fefefe
| 199873 ||  || — || March 13, 2007 || Kitt Peak || Spacewatch || — || align=right data-sort-value="0.98" | 980 m || 
|-id=874 bgcolor=#fefefe
| 199874 ||  || — || March 11, 2007 || Mount Lemmon || Mount Lemmon Survey || — || align=right data-sort-value="0.86" | 860 m || 
|-id=875 bgcolor=#fefefe
| 199875 ||  || — || March 15, 2007 || Catalina || CSS || H || align=right data-sort-value="0.84" | 840 m || 
|-id=876 bgcolor=#fefefe
| 199876 ||  || — || March 15, 2007 || Mount Lemmon || Mount Lemmon Survey || NYS || align=right | 2.0 km || 
|-id=877 bgcolor=#fefefe
| 199877 ||  || — || March 9, 2007 || Kitt Peak || Spacewatch || MAS || align=right | 1.1 km || 
|-id=878 bgcolor=#d6d6d6
| 199878 ||  || — || March 9, 2007 || Kitt Peak || Spacewatch || — || align=right | 4.3 km || 
|-id=879 bgcolor=#fefefe
| 199879 ||  || — || March 9, 2007 || Mount Lemmon || Mount Lemmon Survey || NYS || align=right | 1.1 km || 
|-id=880 bgcolor=#fefefe
| 199880 ||  || — || March 9, 2007 || Kitt Peak || Spacewatch || — || align=right | 1.3 km || 
|-id=881 bgcolor=#fefefe
| 199881 ||  || — || March 9, 2007 || Kitt Peak || Spacewatch || — || align=right | 1.2 km || 
|-id=882 bgcolor=#fefefe
| 199882 ||  || — || March 11, 2007 || Mount Lemmon || Mount Lemmon Survey || V || align=right data-sort-value="0.78" | 780 m || 
|-id=883 bgcolor=#fefefe
| 199883 ||  || — || March 15, 2007 || Kitt Peak || Spacewatch || — || align=right | 1.3 km || 
|-id=884 bgcolor=#fefefe
| 199884 ||  || — || March 10, 2007 || Kitt Peak || Spacewatch || — || align=right | 1.5 km || 
|-id=885 bgcolor=#fefefe
| 199885 ||  || — || March 13, 2007 || Mount Lemmon || Mount Lemmon Survey || V || align=right data-sort-value="0.80" | 800 m || 
|-id=886 bgcolor=#fefefe
| 199886 || 2007 FH || — || March 16, 2007 || Socorro || LINEAR || ERI || align=right | 2.4 km || 
|-id=887 bgcolor=#fefefe
| 199887 ||  || — || March 16, 2007 || Kitt Peak || Spacewatch || — || align=right | 1.2 km || 
|-id=888 bgcolor=#fefefe
| 199888 ||  || — || March 17, 2007 || Kitt Peak || Spacewatch || — || align=right | 1.2 km || 
|-id=889 bgcolor=#E9E9E9
| 199889 ||  || — || March 20, 2007 || Mount Lemmon || Mount Lemmon Survey || — || align=right | 1.6 km || 
|-id=890 bgcolor=#fefefe
| 199890 ||  || — || March 20, 2007 || Mount Lemmon || Mount Lemmon Survey || MAS || align=right | 1.1 km || 
|-id=891 bgcolor=#fefefe
| 199891 ||  || — || March 25, 2007 || Mount Lemmon || Mount Lemmon Survey || — || align=right | 1.1 km || 
|-id=892 bgcolor=#fefefe
| 199892 ||  || — || March 20, 2007 || Catalina || CSS || H || align=right data-sort-value="0.94" | 940 m || 
|-id=893 bgcolor=#fefefe
| 199893 ||  || — || March 26, 2007 || Mount Lemmon || Mount Lemmon Survey || V || align=right data-sort-value="0.87" | 870 m || 
|-id=894 bgcolor=#E9E9E9
| 199894 ||  || — || March 26, 2007 || Mount Lemmon || Mount Lemmon Survey || — || align=right | 2.7 km || 
|-id=895 bgcolor=#E9E9E9
| 199895 ||  || — || March 29, 2007 || Palomar || NEAT || — || align=right | 1.4 km || 
|-id=896 bgcolor=#E9E9E9
| 199896 ||  || — || March 28, 2007 || Siding Spring || SSS || JUN || align=right | 1.4 km || 
|-id=897 bgcolor=#fefefe
| 199897 ||  || — || March 26, 2007 || Mount Lemmon || Mount Lemmon Survey || V || align=right data-sort-value="0.74" | 740 m || 
|-id=898 bgcolor=#E9E9E9
| 199898 ||  || — || March 26, 2007 || Mount Lemmon || Mount Lemmon Survey || — || align=right data-sort-value="0.97" | 970 m || 
|-id=899 bgcolor=#E9E9E9
| 199899 || 2007 GV || — || April 6, 2007 || Palomar || NEAT || — || align=right | 4.4 km || 
|-id=900 bgcolor=#E9E9E9
| 199900 Brunoganz ||  ||  || April 8, 2007 || Vallemare di Borbona || V. S. Casulli || — || align=right | 2.6 km || 
|}

199901–200000 

|-bgcolor=#fefefe
| 199901 ||  || — || April 12, 2007 || Bergisch Gladbach || W. Bickel || NYS || align=right | 1.1 km || 
|-id=902 bgcolor=#fefefe
| 199902 ||  || — || April 7, 2007 || Catalina || CSS || NYS || align=right | 1.0 km || 
|-id=903 bgcolor=#E9E9E9
| 199903 ||  || — || April 11, 2007 || Kitt Peak || Spacewatch || — || align=right | 3.6 km || 
|-id=904 bgcolor=#E9E9E9
| 199904 ||  || — || April 11, 2007 || Catalina || CSS || — || align=right | 4.0 km || 
|-id=905 bgcolor=#fefefe
| 199905 ||  || — || April 11, 2007 || Kitt Peak || Spacewatch || V || align=right data-sort-value="0.95" | 950 m || 
|-id=906 bgcolor=#E9E9E9
| 199906 ||  || — || April 11, 2007 || Kitt Peak || Spacewatch || EUN || align=right | 1.4 km || 
|-id=907 bgcolor=#E9E9E9
| 199907 ||  || — || April 11, 2007 || Kitt Peak || Spacewatch || — || align=right | 2.0 km || 
|-id=908 bgcolor=#E9E9E9
| 199908 ||  || — || April 11, 2007 || Kitt Peak || Spacewatch || — || align=right | 1.2 km || 
|-id=909 bgcolor=#fefefe
| 199909 ||  || — || April 11, 2007 || Kitt Peak || Spacewatch || NYS || align=right | 1.1 km || 
|-id=910 bgcolor=#fefefe
| 199910 ||  || — || April 11, 2007 || Kitt Peak || Spacewatch || MAS || align=right data-sort-value="0.82" | 820 m || 
|-id=911 bgcolor=#d6d6d6
| 199911 ||  || — || April 11, 2007 || Kitt Peak || Spacewatch || — || align=right | 3.9 km || 
|-id=912 bgcolor=#d6d6d6
| 199912 ||  || — || April 11, 2007 || Mount Lemmon || Mount Lemmon Survey || THM || align=right | 3.1 km || 
|-id=913 bgcolor=#fefefe
| 199913 ||  || — || April 11, 2007 || Mount Lemmon || Mount Lemmon Survey || NYS || align=right data-sort-value="0.95" | 950 m || 
|-id=914 bgcolor=#E9E9E9
| 199914 ||  || — || April 11, 2007 || Mount Lemmon || Mount Lemmon Survey || RAF || align=right | 1.4 km || 
|-id=915 bgcolor=#fefefe
| 199915 ||  || — || April 11, 2007 || Mount Lemmon || Mount Lemmon Survey || — || align=right | 1.7 km || 
|-id=916 bgcolor=#fefefe
| 199916 ||  || — || April 11, 2007 || Kitt Peak || Spacewatch || MAS || align=right | 1.0 km || 
|-id=917 bgcolor=#fefefe
| 199917 ||  || — || April 14, 2007 || Kitt Peak || Spacewatch || — || align=right data-sort-value="0.93" | 930 m || 
|-id=918 bgcolor=#E9E9E9
| 199918 ||  || — || April 14, 2007 || Kitt Peak || Spacewatch || — || align=right data-sort-value="0.97" | 970 m || 
|-id=919 bgcolor=#E9E9E9
| 199919 ||  || — || April 14, 2007 || Kitt Peak || Spacewatch || HOF || align=right | 4.7 km || 
|-id=920 bgcolor=#E9E9E9
| 199920 ||  || — || April 15, 2007 || Kitt Peak || Spacewatch || — || align=right | 3.1 km || 
|-id=921 bgcolor=#E9E9E9
| 199921 ||  || — || April 12, 2007 || Siding Spring || SSS || — || align=right | 2.0 km || 
|-id=922 bgcolor=#E9E9E9
| 199922 ||  || — || April 11, 2007 || Siding Spring || SSS || — || align=right | 3.0 km || 
|-id=923 bgcolor=#d6d6d6
| 199923 ||  || — || April 11, 2007 || Mount Lemmon || Mount Lemmon Survey || — || align=right | 2.5 km || 
|-id=924 bgcolor=#fefefe
| 199924 ||  || — || April 13, 2007 || Siding Spring || SSS || — || align=right | 1.2 km || 
|-id=925 bgcolor=#fefefe
| 199925 ||  || — || April 14, 2007 || Kitt Peak || Spacewatch || V || align=right data-sort-value="0.82" | 820 m || 
|-id=926 bgcolor=#fefefe
| 199926 ||  || — || April 14, 2007 || Kitt Peak || Spacewatch || — || align=right data-sort-value="0.87" | 870 m || 
|-id=927 bgcolor=#E9E9E9
| 199927 ||  || — || April 14, 2007 || Kitt Peak || Spacewatch || BRG || align=right | 2.0 km || 
|-id=928 bgcolor=#d6d6d6
| 199928 ||  || — || April 14, 2007 || Kitt Peak || Spacewatch || — || align=right | 4.4 km || 
|-id=929 bgcolor=#fefefe
| 199929 ||  || — || April 14, 2007 || Kitt Peak || Spacewatch || V || align=right data-sort-value="0.70" | 700 m || 
|-id=930 bgcolor=#E9E9E9
| 199930 ||  || — || April 14, 2007 || Kitt Peak || Spacewatch || MIS || align=right | 3.4 km || 
|-id=931 bgcolor=#d6d6d6
| 199931 ||  || — || April 14, 2007 || Kitt Peak || Spacewatch || KOR || align=right | 1.6 km || 
|-id=932 bgcolor=#E9E9E9
| 199932 ||  || — || April 14, 2007 || Kitt Peak || Spacewatch || — || align=right | 1.4 km || 
|-id=933 bgcolor=#fefefe
| 199933 ||  || — || April 14, 2007 || Kitt Peak || Spacewatch || — || align=right data-sort-value="0.98" | 980 m || 
|-id=934 bgcolor=#fefefe
| 199934 ||  || — || April 14, 2007 || Kitt Peak || Spacewatch || — || align=right data-sort-value="0.95" | 950 m || 
|-id=935 bgcolor=#d6d6d6
| 199935 ||  || — || April 14, 2007 || Kitt Peak || Spacewatch || THM || align=right | 3.2 km || 
|-id=936 bgcolor=#E9E9E9
| 199936 ||  || — || April 15, 2007 || Kitt Peak || Spacewatch || — || align=right | 2.9 km || 
|-id=937 bgcolor=#fefefe
| 199937 ||  || — || April 15, 2007 || Socorro || LINEAR || H || align=right data-sort-value="0.97" | 970 m || 
|-id=938 bgcolor=#fefefe
| 199938 ||  || — || April 15, 2007 || Kitt Peak || Spacewatch || V || align=right data-sort-value="0.87" | 870 m || 
|-id=939 bgcolor=#d6d6d6
| 199939 ||  || — || April 15, 2007 || Kitt Peak || Spacewatch || HYG || align=right | 3.8 km || 
|-id=940 bgcolor=#fefefe
| 199940 ||  || — || April 15, 2007 || Kitt Peak || Spacewatch || FLO || align=right data-sort-value="0.88" | 880 m || 
|-id=941 bgcolor=#fefefe
| 199941 ||  || — || April 15, 2007 || Kitt Peak || Spacewatch || — || align=right | 1.2 km || 
|-id=942 bgcolor=#fefefe
| 199942 ||  || — || April 15, 2007 || Kitt Peak || Spacewatch || — || align=right | 1.0 km || 
|-id=943 bgcolor=#E9E9E9
| 199943 ||  || — || April 15, 2007 || Kitt Peak || Spacewatch || — || align=right | 2.7 km || 
|-id=944 bgcolor=#fefefe
| 199944 ||  || — || April 15, 2007 || Catalina || CSS || — || align=right | 1.2 km || 
|-id=945 bgcolor=#E9E9E9
| 199945 ||  || — || April 14, 2007 || Kitt Peak || Spacewatch || — || align=right | 3.8 km || 
|-id=946 bgcolor=#fefefe
| 199946 ||  || — || April 16, 2007 || Mount Lemmon || Mount Lemmon Survey || — || align=right data-sort-value="0.94" | 940 m || 
|-id=947 bgcolor=#E9E9E9
| 199947 Qaidam ||  ||  || April 16, 2007 || XuYi || PMO NEO || — || align=right | 3.3 km || 
|-id=948 bgcolor=#d6d6d6
| 199948 ||  || — || April 18, 2007 || Kitt Peak || Spacewatch || KOR || align=right | 1.9 km || 
|-id=949 bgcolor=#E9E9E9
| 199949 ||  || — || April 21, 2007 || Pises || Pises Obs. || — || align=right | 2.9 km || 
|-id=950 bgcolor=#fefefe
| 199950 Sierpc ||  ||  || April 16, 2007 || Antares || ARO || — || align=right | 1.6 km || 
|-id=951 bgcolor=#E9E9E9
| 199951 ||  || — || April 18, 2007 || Socorro || LINEAR || — || align=right | 1.8 km || 
|-id=952 bgcolor=#E9E9E9
| 199952 ||  || — || April 18, 2007 || Kitt Peak || Spacewatch || — || align=right | 1.3 km || 
|-id=953 bgcolor=#fefefe
| 199953 Mingnaiben ||  ||  || April 18, 2007 || XuYi || PMO NEO || V || align=right | 1.2 km || 
|-id=954 bgcolor=#E9E9E9
| 199954 ||  || — || April 19, 2007 || Mount Lemmon || Mount Lemmon Survey || JUN || align=right data-sort-value="0.97" | 970 m || 
|-id=955 bgcolor=#fefefe
| 199955 ||  || — || April 19, 2007 || Mount Lemmon || Mount Lemmon Survey || — || align=right | 1.5 km || 
|-id=956 bgcolor=#fefefe
| 199956 ||  || — || April 19, 2007 || Kitt Peak || Spacewatch || — || align=right | 1.0 km || 
|-id=957 bgcolor=#fefefe
| 199957 ||  || — || April 20, 2007 || Kitt Peak || Spacewatch || — || align=right | 1.3 km || 
|-id=958 bgcolor=#E9E9E9
| 199958 ||  || — || April 20, 2007 || Kitt Peak || Spacewatch || — || align=right | 3.0 km || 
|-id=959 bgcolor=#d6d6d6
| 199959 ||  || — || April 23, 2007 || Tiki || S. F. Hönig, N. Teamo || — || align=right | 3.0 km || 
|-id=960 bgcolor=#fefefe
| 199960 ||  || — || April 20, 2007 || Kitt Peak || Spacewatch || V || align=right data-sort-value="0.87" | 870 m || 
|-id=961 bgcolor=#E9E9E9
| 199961 ||  || — || April 20, 2007 || Kitt Peak || Spacewatch || — || align=right data-sort-value="0.91" | 910 m || 
|-id=962 bgcolor=#E9E9E9
| 199962 ||  || — || April 20, 2007 || Kitt Peak || Spacewatch || — || align=right | 1.3 km || 
|-id=963 bgcolor=#d6d6d6
| 199963 ||  || — || April 20, 2007 || Kitt Peak || Spacewatch || EOS || align=right | 3.3 km || 
|-id=964 bgcolor=#fefefe
| 199964 ||  || — || April 20, 2007 || Lulin Observatory || LUSS || — || align=right | 1.1 km || 
|-id=965 bgcolor=#fefefe
| 199965 ||  || — || April 22, 2007 || Catalina || CSS || — || align=right | 1.8 km || 
|-id=966 bgcolor=#E9E9E9
| 199966 ||  || — || April 22, 2007 || Catalina || CSS || AER || align=right | 2.2 km || 
|-id=967 bgcolor=#fefefe
| 199967 ||  || — || April 23, 2007 || Kitt Peak || Spacewatch || — || align=right data-sort-value="0.83" | 830 m || 
|-id=968 bgcolor=#fefefe
| 199968 ||  || — || April 23, 2007 || Kitt Peak || Spacewatch || — || align=right | 1.1 km || 
|-id=969 bgcolor=#d6d6d6
| 199969 ||  || — || April 22, 2007 || Kitt Peak || Spacewatch || THM || align=right | 2.7 km || 
|-id=970 bgcolor=#d6d6d6
| 199970 ||  || — || April 22, 2007 || Kitt Peak || Spacewatch || THM || align=right | 2.6 km || 
|-id=971 bgcolor=#fefefe
| 199971 ||  || — || April 22, 2007 || Kitt Peak || Spacewatch || — || align=right data-sort-value="0.96" | 960 m || 
|-id=972 bgcolor=#fefefe
| 199972 ||  || — || April 27, 2007 || Kitt Peak || Spacewatch || H || align=right data-sort-value="0.89" | 890 m || 
|-id=973 bgcolor=#E9E9E9
| 199973 ||  || — || April 24, 2007 || Kitt Peak || Spacewatch || KON || align=right | 3.6 km || 
|-id=974 bgcolor=#fefefe
| 199974 ||  || — || April 19, 2007 || Mount Lemmon || Mount Lemmon Survey || V || align=right data-sort-value="0.69" | 690 m || 
|-id=975 bgcolor=#E9E9E9
| 199975 ||  || — || April 20, 2007 || Kitt Peak || Spacewatch || EUN || align=right | 1.5 km || 
|-id=976 bgcolor=#E9E9E9
| 199976 || 2007 JR || — || May 7, 2007 || Mount Lemmon || Mount Lemmon Survey || — || align=right | 2.0 km || 
|-id=977 bgcolor=#E9E9E9
| 199977 ||  || — || May 7, 2007 || Kitt Peak || Spacewatch || — || align=right | 1.1 km || 
|-id=978 bgcolor=#E9E9E9
| 199978 ||  || — || May 7, 2007 || Catalina || CSS || — || align=right | 3.3 km || 
|-id=979 bgcolor=#E9E9E9
| 199979 ||  || — || May 7, 2007 || Catalina || CSS || RAF || align=right | 3.8 km || 
|-id=980 bgcolor=#fefefe
| 199980 ||  || — || May 9, 2007 || Mount Lemmon || Mount Lemmon Survey || — || align=right | 1.1 km || 
|-id=981 bgcolor=#E9E9E9
| 199981 ||  || — || May 7, 2007 || Catalina || CSS || — || align=right | 4.6 km || 
|-id=982 bgcolor=#E9E9E9
| 199982 ||  || — || May 8, 2007 || Anderson Mesa || LONEOS || — || align=right | 1.5 km || 
|-id=983 bgcolor=#E9E9E9
| 199983 ||  || — || May 8, 2007 || Lulin Observatory || LUSS || EUN || align=right | 2.0 km || 
|-id=984 bgcolor=#fefefe
| 199984 ||  || — || May 7, 2007 || Kitt Peak || Spacewatch || V || align=right data-sort-value="0.93" | 930 m || 
|-id=985 bgcolor=#fefefe
| 199985 ||  || — || May 7, 2007 || Kitt Peak || Spacewatch || — || align=right | 1.5 km || 
|-id=986 bgcolor=#E9E9E9
| 199986 Chervone ||  ||  || May 9, 2007 || Andrushivka || Andrushivka Obs. || — || align=right | 4.8 km || 
|-id=987 bgcolor=#d6d6d6
| 199987 ||  || — || May 12, 2007 || Tiki || S. F. Hönig, N. Teamo || LIX || align=right | 4.9 km || 
|-id=988 bgcolor=#E9E9E9
| 199988 ||  || — || May 12, 2007 || Tiki || S. F. Hönig, N. Teamo || — || align=right | 3.1 km || 
|-id=989 bgcolor=#E9E9E9
| 199989 ||  || — || May 7, 2007 || Catalina || CSS || RAF || align=right | 1.9 km || 
|-id=990 bgcolor=#E9E9E9
| 199990 ||  || — || May 8, 2007 || Anderson Mesa || LONEOS || — || align=right | 1.2 km || 
|-id=991 bgcolor=#E9E9E9
| 199991 Adriencoffinet ||  ||  || May 9, 2007 || Mount Lemmon || Mount Lemmon Survey || — || align=right | 1.1 km || 
|-id=992 bgcolor=#E9E9E9
| 199992 ||  || — || May 9, 2007 || Kitt Peak || Spacewatch || — || align=right | 2.3 km || 
|-id=993 bgcolor=#E9E9E9
| 199993 ||  || — || May 9, 2007 || Kitt Peak || Spacewatch || MIT || align=right | 3.6 km || 
|-id=994 bgcolor=#fefefe
| 199994 ||  || — || May 10, 2007 || Mount Lemmon || Mount Lemmon Survey || — || align=right | 2.2 km || 
|-id=995 bgcolor=#d6d6d6
| 199995 ||  || — || May 12, 2007 || Mount Lemmon || Mount Lemmon Survey || — || align=right | 3.3 km || 
|-id=996 bgcolor=#E9E9E9
| 199996 ||  || — || May 9, 2007 || Mount Lemmon || Mount Lemmon Survey || — || align=right | 1.9 km || 
|-id=997 bgcolor=#E9E9E9
| 199997 ||  || — || May 11, 2007 || Catalina || CSS || BAR || align=right | 2.4 km || 
|-id=998 bgcolor=#E9E9E9
| 199998 ||  || — || May 11, 2007 || Siding Spring || SSS || — || align=right | 2.2 km || 
|-id=999 bgcolor=#E9E9E9
| 199999 ||  || — || May 12, 2007 || Mount Lemmon || Mount Lemmon Survey || NEM || align=right | 3.4 km || 
|-id=000 bgcolor=#E9E9E9
| 200000 Danielparrott ||  ||  || May 12, 2007 || Mount Lemmon || Mount Lemmon Survey || — || align=right | 3.6 km || 
|}

References

External links 
 Discovery Circumstances: Numbered Minor Planets (195001)–(200000) (IAU Minor Planet Center)

0199